= Shiny Entertainment =

American video game developer

Shiny Entertainment, Inc.
- The primary logo for Shiny Entertainment, created by producing and then using a rubber stamp, and revised when the company moved into 3D games
- Type: Subsidiary
- Industry: Video games
- Founded: October 1993; 32 years ago
- Founder: David Perry
- Defunct: October 9, 2007
- Fate: Merged with The Collective
- Successor: Double Helix Games
- Headquarters: Laguna Beach, California, U.S.
- Key people: David Perry (president; 1993–2006); Michael Persson (studio head; 2006–2007)
- Products: Earthworm Jim series; MDK; Messiah; Sacrifice; Enter the Matrix
- Parent: Interplay Entertainment; (1995–2002); Atari, Inc.; (2002–2006); Foundation 9 Entertainment; (2006–2007)

Shiny Entertainment, Inc. was an American video game developer based in Laguna Beach, California. Founded in October 1993 by David Perry, Shiny was the creator of video games such as Earthworm Jim, MDK and Enter the Matrix. Perry sold the company to Interplay Productions in 1995, which sold the studio to Infogrames, Inc. in 2002. After Foundation 9 Entertainment acquired Shiny in 2006, the company was merged with The Collective in October 2007, creating Double Helix Games.

== History ==
=== Background and formation (1980s–1993) ===
David Perry, a video game programmer from Northern Ireland, created his first video game in 1982, when he was 15, for the Sinclair ZX81 that he had at home. This led him to move to London, England, shortly following his 17th birthday, where would work with several early video game developers on games for the ZX Spectrum. One of these companies was Probe Software, where Perry worked on The Terminator, published by Virgin Games. By 1991, Perry had moved to Irvine, California, to work for the internal development studio of Virgin Games' American branch. At Virgin Games, Perry worked on three successful promotional games: Global Gladiators for McDonald's, Cool Spot for 7 Up, and Disney's Aladdin. All three games were profitable enough that Perry, after two years at Virgin Games, opted to leave the company.

At the time, he had received employment offers from the Sega Technical Institute and Playmates Toys; the latter was a toy company that had produced toys based on the Teenage Mutant Ninja Turtles license and was looking to move into video games from that same license. Perry turned down both offers, instead working out an agreement with Playmates that would see the company fund an independent studio with several million dollars, in exchange for the publishing rights to the first three games developed by that studio. Playmates agreed, and Perry, once he had gained lawful permanent resident status in the U.S., set up Shiny Entertainment using Playmates' funds in October 1993. Offices for the company were set up in Laguna Beach, California, and Perry was appointed as the company's president. Several developers formerly of Virgin Games followed Perry and joined Shiny, bringing its employee count to "around nine". The name "Shiny" was taken from the song "Shiny Happy People" by R.E.M., which was popular around the time of the company's inception, while the "Entertainment" suffix was chosen because Perry believed that, should the studio attempt to co-operate with Hollywood film production companies, such companies would rather work with an "entertainment" company than with a "games" company. Despite this precaution, Shiny was often mistaken for a pornography production company.

=== Earthworm Jim and acquisition by Interplay (1994–1995) ===
According to Perry, the young Shiny was not sure what to do, having neither a game project, nor a business plan. However, since Playmates was new to the video game industry, Playmates Interactive, the publishing arm set up by the toy company, had no high expectations. Playmates aided Shiny in finding licenses for potential game projects, and Shiny came close to developing a game based on the Knight Rider TV series, but eventually settled on creating an original game. When the company was about to hire Doug TenNapel, an animator formerly of DreamWorks, TenNapel demonstrated his skills by creating a sketch for a game character that would later become Earthworm Jim. The character's abilities were worked out by Perry and TenNapel, and the surrounding game, also called Earthworm Jim, became Shiny's first development project. To help with the game's promotion, Playmates set out to create Earthworm Jim toys, but required that a TV series should be produced to market the toys. Perry subsequently met with executives of Universal Studios, who agreed to produce the series if there were toys to accompany it. The deadlock was resolved when Perry invited the heads of Universal and Playmates for dinner, agreeing each party would fulfill their part of the deal. The game was released on console in 1994 to much success, spawning several sequels, spin-offs and ports to other platforms.

Following a sequel to Earthworm Jim, Earthworm Jim 2, Shiny ought to produce a game with 3D computer graphics, however, Perry was concerned that his team, which had only worked on 2D games, would find it difficult to produce a 3D game. Seeking help from other companies, Perry was offered deals by Nintendo and Sony to exclusively develop for these companies' console, but he instead agreed to sell Shiny to another video game publisher, Interplay Productions. The deal was announced by Interplay at the Electronic Entertainment Expo 1995, with Shiny retaining its identity and management under the new ownership. Following this buy-out, half of Shiny's employees, including TenNapel, left Shiny to form The Neverhood, Inc., another game developer. Meanwhile, Perry instituted a strict no-sequels policy at Shiny to ensure that new games developed by the studio would be surprising and associated with the developer, rather than with a franchise.

=== Further games (1996–2001) ===
The next game produced by Shiny was MDK, produced fully in 3D. The studio's team successfully switched from 2D to 3D development, and MDK, released in 1997, became a very successful game. Aside from being used as a benchmark test for new graphics cards by various magazines, Shiny scored between 40 and 60 deals to include support for peripherals, including joysticks and 3D glasses, as well as deal with Apple Inc. that saw MDK pre-installed on every first-generation iMac. Perry sold Shiny Entertainment, doubting his team's ability to produce a 3D game, a decision he came to view as the worst mistake in his career. After MDK shipped, Shiny employees Nick Bruty and Bob Stevenson left the company to form Planet Moon Studios with the same development principles as Shiny. Further Shiny games—Wild 9, R/C Stunt Copter, Messiah, and Sacrifice—were developed in parallel at the company, leading to what Perry said was simultaneously diluting focus and talent, and none of the games sold as well as MDK.

=== Sale to Infogrames and Foundation 9, and merger (2002–2007) ===
In April 2002, during financial instability at Interplay, Shiny was sold off to Infogrames, Inc. (later renamed Atari, Inc.) for US$47 million. Enter the Matrix, which was in development at Shiny at time, also changed hands to the buyer. Under Atari, Perry conceptualized a game named Plague, which Atari forced him to significantly size down to meet budget requirements. This led Perry to leave the company on February 16, 2006. He was succeeded by Michael Persson, who became the studio's studio head. Perry went on to found GameConsultants.com, a consultancy firm for video game investors, in May 2006, and by September had joined Acclaim Games and was working on a massively multiplayer online game called 2Moons.

Shortly following Perry's resignation, Atari announced that it was reducing its staff count by 20% and sell all of its internal studios, both actions also affecting Shiny. Perry's role as not an employee of Atari meant that he could aid Shiny find the best possible buyer. Thus, on October 2, 2006, Atari agreed to sell Shiny to Foundation 9 Entertainment under the terms that Shiny would at some point co-locate with The Collective, another Foundation 9 studio. On October 9, 2007, Foundation 9 announced that Shiny and The Collective were being merged; both studios had relocated their teams to new 60,000-square-foot (5,600 m^{2}) offices in Irvine, California, from where the merged company would operate under the lead of Persson. In March 2008, the new studio was named Double Helix Games.

== Games developed ==
Year	Title	Notes
1994	Earthworm Jim	
1995	Earthworm Jim 2	
1997	MDK	
1998	Wild 9	
1999	R/C Stunt Copter	
2000	Messiah	
2000	Sacrifice	
2003	Enter the Matrix	
2003	Terminator 3: Rise of the Machines	Supportive development for Black Ops Entertainment
2005	The Matrix: Path of Neo	
2007	The Golden Compass	
