= Stephen Clarke-Willson =

American video game executive

- Occupation: Video game executive
- Employer: ArenaNet
- Notable work: Disney's Aladdin, Global Gladiators, Cool Spot, Disney’s Jungle Book, The 7th Guest, Color a Dinosaur
- Title: Studio Technical Director

Stephen Clarke-Willson is an American video game executive. He served as the vice president of Virgin Interactive in the early 1990s.

== Summary ==
From 1990 to 1994, he was the vice president of Virgin Interactive. He was instrumental in Virgin's acquisition of Westwood Studios, after which he supervised budgets at Westwood.

He supervised the production of games for the Super NES and the Genesis like Disney's Aladdin, Global Gladiators, Cool Spot, and Disney’s Jungle Book and The Seventh Guest for MS-DOS. He was also the producer of one of the most ridiculed games of all time, Color a Dinosaur.

He published a SIGGRAPH paper, "Applying Game Design to Virtual Environments".

Clarke-Willson now works at ArenaNet as the Studio Technical Director for Guild Wars.
