= RoboCop versus Terminator =

RoboCop versus Terminator may refer to:

- RoboCop Versus The Terminator, a 1993 video game based on the RoboCop and Terminator franchises, and loosely based on:
- RoboCop Versus The Terminator (comics), a 1992 four-issue comic book crossover limited series written by Frank Miller and published by Dark Horse Comics
- Terminator vs. RoboCop, the 9th episode of the 4th season of the YouTube series Epic Rap Battles of History
