= Wild 9 =

1998 video game

- North American box art
- Developer: Shiny Entertainment
- Publisher: Interplay Productions
- Designers: Tom Tanaka; Kevin Munroe; David Perry
- Composers: Tommy Tallarico; Sascha Dikiciyan
- Platform: PlayStation
- Release: NA: September 30, 1998; EU: September 1998
- Genre: Platform game
- Mode: Single-player

Wild 9 is a 2.5D platform video game for the PlayStation. The game was designed by David Perry, developed by Shiny Entertainment, and published by Interplay Productions, all of whom were involved in Earthworm Jim series of video games. The game was released in North America and Europe in September 1998.

== Gameplay ==
The game is a run and gun platformer sidescrolling video game. While the game has 3D, polygonal graphics, gameplay only takes place on a 2D plane, although occasionally, the game does allow for the player to move the character into the foreground or background. The player controls the movements of the main character, Wex Major, manipulating him around obstacles through to the end of the level. Wex's main weapon is called the "Rig", which is an electrical beam coming from Wex's back, used to defeat enemies. The "Rig" latches on to enemies, allowing the player to whip around or thrash enemies. Common scenarios involve bashing them into the floor or walls, or carrying enemies and moving them into other parts of the environments, like pits or spikes.

== Story ==
The game stars Wex Major, a young male who gets lost in an unfamiliar galaxy. He eventually meets up with eight other off-beat, strange adventurers, and becomes the leader of the group, which they dub the "Wild 9". The "Nine" consists of "Nitro", who has serious allergy problems and explodes once coming across said allergens; "Pokkit", who has a special jacket with an infinite amount of pockets full of an infinite number of things; "Pilfer", a lizard with thousands of separate personalities; "Volstagg", a strong person with gorilla and gazelle DNA; "Crystal", who is solar-powered and has a body made of crystal with living hair; "Boomer McTwist", who has powers from wearing the kilt of her Scottish superhero father, "MacSheen", who is adept with tools but is rather hormonal; "Henry", a sentient being made entirely out of water; and "B'Angus" (B is silent), who looks similar to a chihuahua and lives inside the Rig item, providing advice for Wex.

The evil Karn, a being who is 376 years old, desires to use the "Rig" item as a method of enslaving and controlling the inhabitants of the universe. Karn kidnaps the rest of the "Wild 9" crew, leaving it up to Wex to rescue them and ultimately defeat Karn.

== Development ==
=== Origins ===
The game shared many key parties involved in Earthworm Jim series of video games. Developer Shiny Entertainment, publisher Interplay Entertainment, and key staff members, such as designers David Perry and Tom Tanaka all worked on the Earthworm Jim series and Wild 9. Development for the game started in 1996, shortly after the release of Shiny's Earthworm Jim 2, and spanned three years. Initial ideas for the game included having a female character who possessed a special glove that could instantly vaporize enemies. From there, the idea progressed to an item that could do hand-like motions, only with 1,000 times the strength of a typical human, before it finally evolved into the game's final premise of a male character, Wex, who controlled the "Rig". The game initially started up development for the Sega Saturn and the PlayStation, however, the Saturn version was cancelled early in development. Perry's disillusionment with Sega of America's Saturn strategy was cited as the reason for the cancellation. Shortly after, Perry posted online that development on the Saturn version would resume if and when he was satisfied that Sega of America were making the Saturn a commercially viable platform. Kevin Munroe, designer and lead animator on the project, stated that the development team aimed for the feel of the game to be as "...if George Lucas co-wrote Star Wars with Lewis Carroll. And imagine if George Lucas then codirected it with Tex Avery."

The animations were rendered manually, instead of by the increasingly prevalent motion capture technique. By the end of 1997, Shiny were looking into incorporating the tessellation graphics technology created for Messiah into Wild 9.

=== Release ===
Interplay gave the game a four million dollar budget for marketing the game, relatively large for a video game in the late 1990s. This included commercials played on major cable networks, such as ABC and Comedy Central, and a spot on the demo discs packed in every new PlayStation console sold at the time.

== Reception ==
Reception

Aggregate score
Aggregator	Score
GameRankings	76%

Review scores
Publication	Score
CNET Gamecenter	4/10
Edge	6/10
Electronic Gaming Monthly	7.75/10
Famitsu	28/40
Game Informer	6.25/10
GameRevolution	B+
GameSpot	5.1/10
IGN	8.5/10
Next Generation	3/5
Official U.S. PlayStation Magazine	3.5/5

The game received favorable reviews according to the review aggregation website GameRankings.

IGN praised the game, comparing it favorably to Earthworm Jim and praising the game for making it fun to torture enemies in many ways, without feeling guilty due to enemies appearing neither human nor realistic. GameRevolution praised it for being "off-beat" and "imaginative" in a similar manner to Earthworm Jim, but said that, despite its innovative "torture" moves with the "Rig" weapon, the gameplay still ultimately boiled down to basic platforming and item collection. GamePro said that the game was "funny, wickedly subtle, and almost as amusing to play as it is to watch. It resurrects the old side-scrolling platform game, adding some Jim-esque humor and head-scratching puzzles. This game definitely has nine lives." (Note: GamePro gave the game two 4.5/5 scores for graphics and control, and two 5/5 scores for sound and fun factor.)

Electronic Gaming Monthly highlighted the game's 2.5D graphics and innovative gameplay, but criticized its challenging and unforgiving difficulty. Similarly, Edge remarked that the game's checkpoints were wrongly positioned and that the scenery can obstruct the player's view of the gameplay. GameSpot was far less enthusiastic with the game, stating "The whole play mechanic of using the rig to move objects and enemies about may seem pretty interesting at first, but soon gets rather tiring...Wild 9 is one of those games that purports to have a unique concept behind it, yet falls flat in its implementation." Next Generation shared similar sentiments, saying, "As unique and fun as this is [...] the game's rocky development history shows in its occasionally sloppy control, clichéd platform structure (kill enemies, solve puzzles, fight boss, repeat), general lack of variety, and fairly short playing time." In Japan, where the game was ported and published by Sony Computer Entertainment Japan under the name Wildroid 9 (ワイルドロイド9, Wairudoroido 9) on February 10, 2000, Famitsu gave it a score of 28 out of 40.

Wild 9 was a finalist at the AIAS' 2nd Annual Interactive Achievement Awards for "Outstanding Achievement in Sound and Music", which ultimately went to Road Rash 3D.
