= Emmy Perry =

American child actress (born 2004)

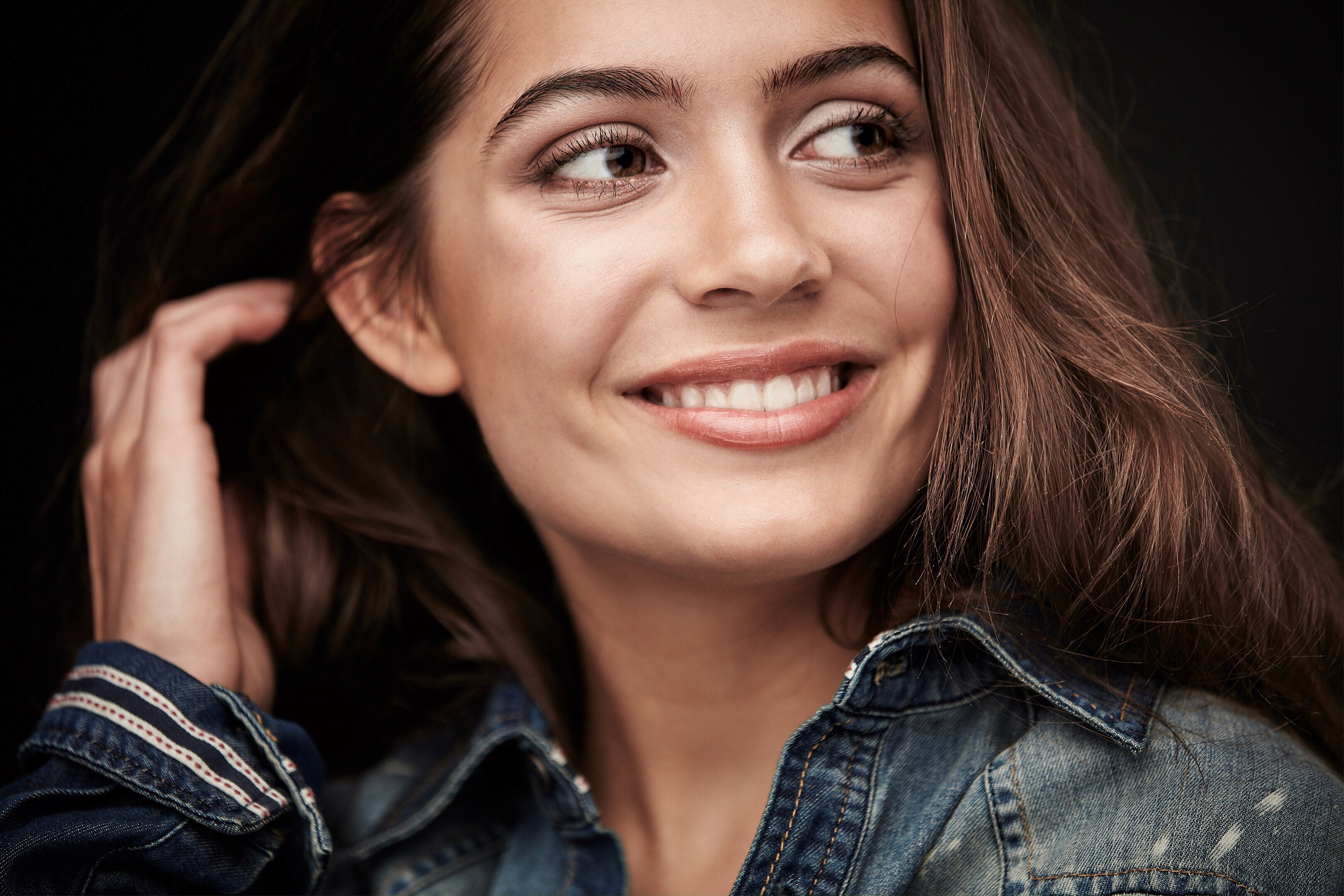
- Emmy Perry, age 14, in 2019
- Born: September 10, 2004 (age 21); Newport Beach, California, U.S.
- Occupation: Actress
- Years active: 2014–present
- Known for: Scales: Mermaids are Real
- Notable work: Emmy's Hope (Animal Rescue)
- Father: David Perry
- Website: emmyshope.com

Emmy Perry (born September 10, 2004) is an American actress.

== Career ==
Perry is the daughter of game designer and producer David Perry. She started acting in the theater, and when she was seven, shared the stage at the Greek Theater in a duet with Kristin Chenoweth. She has had parts in TV shows including Glee. In 2015, she costarred with Morgan Fairchild and Jason London in the film Wiener Dog Internationals as "Kitty". Her first lead role is in the 2017 feature film "Scales, Mermaids are Real", as Siren Phillips alongside Morgan Fairchild and Elisabeth Röhm. The movie is handled by VMI Worldwide. In 2022, she acted in the film Mid-Century as "Hannah" along with Stephen Lang (the main antagonist from the movie Avatar), also Shane West and Bruce Dern.

She was a Celebrity Luminary for the Helen Woodward Animal Center's "Remember me Thursday" and named one of their Christmas Angels. Perry was named one of 12 of the most talented and driven standout Whiz Kids in Orange County, California. Perry is also an ambassador for Generation On and named a Hasbro Community Action Hero Semi finalist for her dedication to service and efforts to impact their local and global communities. She was also asked to be a part of The Project For Girls.

=== Charity work ===
Perry is an animal advocate and founder of Emmy's Hope, an animal rescue charity. The major brand Kleenex sponsored the charity with a weekend of free adoptions and filmed a national commercial in honor of Emmy and Emmy's Hope. Perry has also spoken in front of the Orange County Board of Directors and Board of Supervisors on behalf of homeless animals and animal welfare, and received several recognitions and awards.

== Filmography ==
=== Films ===
Year	Title	Role	Notes
2017	Weiner Dogs International	Kitty	
2017	Scales: Mermaids Are Real	Siren Phillips	
2017	26 Candles	Jenny B.	
2022	Mid-Century	Hannah	

=== Television ===
Year	Title	Role	Notes
2018	Kismet	Young Becky	
2016	Nickelodeon Kids Choice Sports 2016	As Herself	Episode: "2016 Awards Show"
