= RoboCop Versus The Terminator =

1993 video game

- European Mega Drive cover
- Developers: Virgin Games (GEN); NMS Software (GG, MS); Interplay Team Rivet (SNES); Unexpected Development (GB)
- Publisher: Virgin Interactive Entertainment
- Director: John Botti
- Producer: Scott Duckett
- Designers: Timothy Williams; Noah Tool; John Botti
- Composer: Mark Miller
- Series: RoboCop; Terminator
- Platforms: Mega Drive/Genesis, Game Gear, Master System, Super NES, Game Boy
- Release: December 12, 1993: Genesis; NA: December 12, 1993; EU: December 1993 Super NES; NA: December 12, 1993; EU: August 24, 1995 Master System; EU: December 1993 Game Gear; NA: 1993; EU: 1993 Game Boy; NA: August 1994; EU: 1994
- Genre: Run and gun
- Mode: Single-player

RoboCop Versus The Terminator is a run and gun game released for the Sega Genesis, Super Nintendo Entertainment System, Master System, and Game Gear in 1993, with a port to the Game Boy in 1994. It is based on the 1992 four-issue comic book mini-series of the same name, which is a crossover between the RoboCop and Terminator franchises. Despite their likenesses being shown on packaging, the actors who portrayed the titular characters (Arnold Schwarzenegger in 1984's The Terminator and Peter Weller in 1987's RoboCop) did not reprise their roles in this game.

The Genesis version was developed by Virgin Games and uses an engine written by David Perry.

== Plot ==
=== Super NES ===
In the future, human soldiers of John Connor's resistance force are fighting a losing war against Skynet and its robot forces. Discovering that one of the foundation technologies for Skynet is the cybernetics technology used in the creation of cyborg police officer RoboCop, Flo, a resistance soldier, is sent back in time to destroy RoboCop and stop Skynet from being built. However, Skynet learns of the time travel attempt and sends Terminators to stop Flo. RoboCop soon meets up with Flo and must engage in battle against Terminators, the forces of OCP and several obstacles.

Upon discovering one of the Terminators has infiltrated the OCP building, RoboCop plugs himself into a console to reprogram the security, only to fall into a trap and be digitized. After his body is disassembled and used for building Skynet, RoboCop watches Skynet come to power before using his digitized mind to seize control of an abandoned robotics factory, rebuild himself, and begin to destroy Skynet in the future. He successfully destroys the Skynet CPU and prevails, and turns his sights to helping humanity rebuild from the devastation.

=== Mega Drive/Genesis ===
Set a few years after RoboCop's invention, the story involves SAC-NORAD contracting Cyberdyne Systems on building Skynet. Cyberdyne used RoboCop's technology in creating Skynet. When activated, Skynet becomes self-aware and launches a war against mankind. In the future, Skynet sends several Terminators back to the past to cripple the Resistance. After destroying one of the Terminators, RoboCop proceeds to Delta City, where he confronts RoboCain.

After RoboCain was destroyed, RoboCop battles his way to the OCP building, where he defeats all the Terminators. After defeating an ED-209 unit reprogrammed by the Terminators, RoboCop plugs himself into a console. Unbeknownst to him, RoboCop gave Skynet information it can use. This ends up with RoboCop falling into a trap. In the future, RoboCop assembles himself, where he battled in the Terminator-infested future and destroyed Skynet.

== Development ==
RoboCop Versus The Terminator began as a four-part comic book series also titled RoboCop Versus The Terminator in 1992. Virgin Games secured a license for a video game based on the comic but were unable to use the comics plot elements. The team began developing it in-house at the same time as they were developing Disney's Aladdin. Botti said the license for the title cost $2 million.

The lead designer and coder on the game was John Botti. Tim Wiliams who worked alongside him, stated that "At the time, I seem to remember there were more high-profile games at Virgin, like Aladdin, so there was a feeling that [RoboCop Versus The Terminator] was the ugly stepchild when I joined the team. But I was absolutely thrilled to get my own game to design for." Williams and Botti began staying up at night playing Contra III: The Alien Wars, one of their favourite games, to find what made its gameplay addictive. The two concluded that the "vectored bullets" was key and included it as a core mechanic in RoboCop Versus the Terminator. To save time during development, the game uses Dave Perry's Mega Drive engine which was recently used in games Cool Spot and Global Gladiators. Botti stated he has his own tools from previous projects, but Perry's engine "was clean, and it has been used on other Genesis games. I enhanced it, making a linked-list sprite object that allowed these huge monster bosses at the end of some levels."

The game featured more gore and violence than most games for the Genesis at the time. Botti recalled that "We were all like 22 years old, and we wanted as much gore and blood as possible!"

== Reception ==
Reception

Review scores
Publication	Score		
Publication	Game Boy	Sega Genesis	SNES
AllGame	N/A	4/5	N/A
Computer and Video Games	N/A	93/100	88/100
Mean Machines Sega	N/A	90/100	N/A
Total!	56/100	N/A	N/A

Electronic Gaming Monthly's team of five reviewers gave the Super NES version a 5.8 out of 10. Mike Weigand, who gave it a 5, commented: "The comic book-esque cinema sequences are innovative and new, but the intensity isn't there". EGM gave the Game Gear version a 6.8 out of 10, with Weigand saying that it "holds up pretty well", though he commented that it suffers from slowdown, breakup, and difficulty which is slightly too high. The Genesis version was awarded Bloodiest Game of 1993 by Electronic Gaming Monthly.

A review of the Game Boy version in Nintendo Power stated that the game had good graphics but lacked in any sort of game strategy or challenge and that the control was very stiff.

== See also ==
- Alien vs. Predator
