= David Perry (game developer) =

Northern Irish video game designer

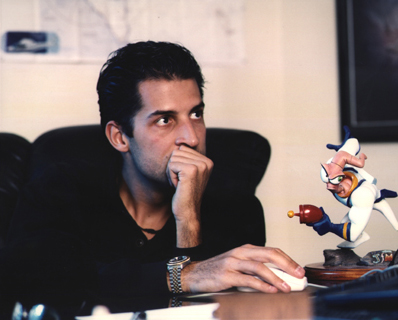
- David Perry, 1996
- Born: 4 April 1967 (age 59); Lisburn, Northern Ireland
- Occupations: Video game developer, programmer
- Known for: Shiny Entertainment; Gaikai
- Spouse: Elaine Perry (m. 2001)
- Children: Emmy Perry

David Perry (born 4 April 1967) is a Northern Irish video game developer and programmer. He became prominent for programming platform games for 16-bit home consoles in the early to mid 1990s, including Disney's Aladdin, Cool Spot, and the Earthworm Jim series. He founded Shiny Entertainment, where he worked from 1993 to 2006. Perry created games for companies such as Disney, 7 Up, McDonald's, Hemdale, and Warner Bros. In 2008 he was presented with an honorary doctorate from Queen's University Belfast for his services to computer gaming. He was the co-founder and CEO of cloud-based games service Gaikai, which was acquired by Sony Computer Entertainment. In 2017 Perry became the co-founder & CEO of a customer intelligence startup called GoVYRL, Inc. developing a new advanced brand dashboard called Carro.

== Biography ==
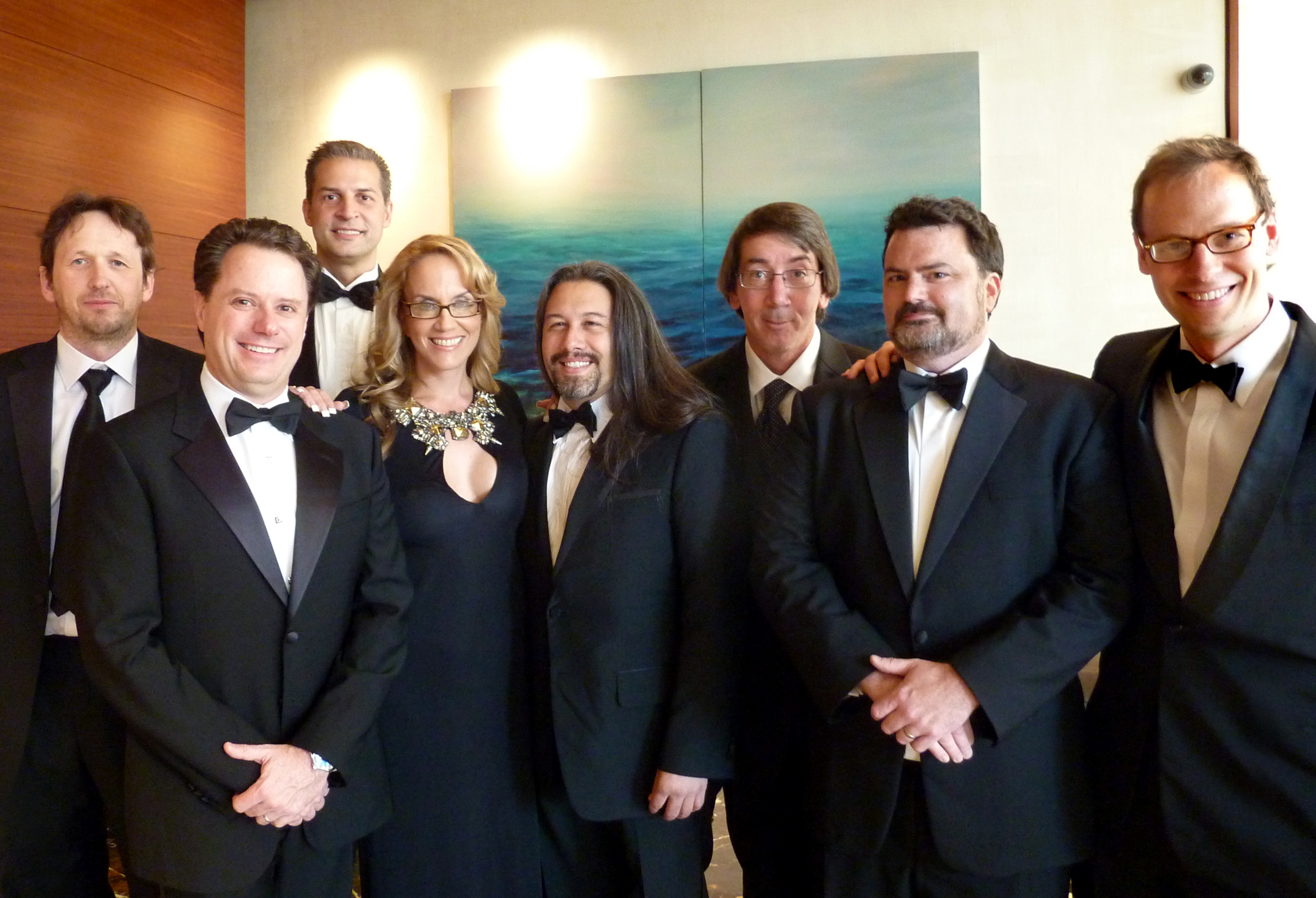
Perry and other game developers at a BAFTA event in Los Angeles in July 2011. From left: Rod Humble, Louis Castle, David Perry, Brenda Brathwaite, John Romero, Will Wright, Tim Schafer, Chris Hecker.

Perry was born in April 1967 in Lisburn, Northern Ireland, growing up in the towns of Templepatrick and Donegore in County Antrim, attending Templepatrick Primary School and then Methodist College Belfast.

He began writing computer game programming books in 1982 at the age of 15, creating his own games for the Sinclair ZX81. In an interview with the BBC, Perry stated that his first game was a driving game, "a black blob avoiding other black blobs", which he wrote and sent to a magazine, which printed it. He sent them more games, and they sent him a cheque for £450: a bit of a problem for a teenager who did not yet have a bank account. His work continued until he was offered a job for £3,500/year as an apprentice to a veteran programmer who taught him more advanced programming.

At the age of 17, he moved to London, where he developed games with Mikro-Gen and Probe Software for publishers such as Elite Systems and Mirrorsoft, working on titles such as the ZX Spectrum conversion of Teenage Mutant Ninja Turtles (1991) for NES and the Sega Genesis version of The Terminator (1992). Perry's work on The Terminator caught the attention of Virgin Mastertronic, which was expanding into the United States and had entered a deal with McDonald's to publish a video game themed around its restaurants within six months. Perry responded to Virgin's generous employment offer into their American development branch in Irvine, California, and was granted an apartment overlooking Laguna Beach, which he remarked was "like living in Baywatch". Although Perry had planned to return to the United Kingdom upon the game's completion, the unexpected critical success of Global Gladiators (1992) convinced him to stay in California; as he recalled, "it suddenly made people appreciate me".

While at Virgin, Perry led the development duties for several award-winning games for the Genesis, including Cool Spot (1993) and Aladdin (1993). His work within Virgin Games also served as a basis for the development of other games such as the Sega CD version of The Terminator (1993) and the Genesis versions of RoboCop Versus The Terminator (1994) and Walt Disney's The Jungle Book (1994), all of them developed after David Perry had left the studio.

On 1 October 1993, Perry formed his own company in Laguna Beach, California, Shiny Entertainment, naming the company after the song "Shiny Happy People" by R.E.M. The company's first game, Earthworm Jim (1994), was a hit, selling millions of copies on multiple platforms, including Sega Genesis, Super NES and PC. The title character, an "average worm" who stumbles upon a space suit which turns him into a superhero, became immensely popular, and spawned a variety of other types of merchandise: action figures, comic books, and a syndicated television cartoon series.

Listing Perry in their "75 Most Important People in the Games Industry of 1995", Next Generation argued that his success had as much to do with his exceptional knack for public relations as his talent as a developer: "Perry often seems to benefit and suffer from a game press who seemingly can't hype him or his products enough. Is all the hype justified? Well, probably not. But that's not the point, the fact is that the press and gamers love him. Next Generation's opinion as to Perry's PR secrets? Always return phone calls, don't make promises you can't keep, and show a genuine interest in whomever you're talking to. Sounds easy? So how come hardly any actual PR people (let alone presidents and lead programmers) in the industry do the same?"

In 2002, Shiny Entertainment was acquired by Atari, Inc. for US$47 million, with Perry signed to a long-term contract to continue on as president. Also in 2002, Perry collaborated with The Wachowskis on games in coordination with their Matrix series of movies.

In 2006, he resigned from Shiny, and formed GameConsultants.com, a consultancy firm planning to offer executive level video game industry advice, followed by GameInvestors.com, a business-to-business company to help video game development teams get funded. He recounted, "I was working on a new game design for Infogrames (Atari) called Plague and was incredibly excited about it. Atari called and told me they had run out of money, and so I offered to find a buyer for my team, they said they'd handle it and I moved on. The first phone call I had after leaving was with The Collective, and they ended up buying Shiny."

Perry is on the advisory board for the Game Developers Conference, and has spoken at industry venues such as E3, CES, Hollywood and Games, Digital Hollywood, iHollywood, SIGGRAPH, Entertainment in the Interactive Age, What Teens Want, The Banff Summit, as well as at major universities such as USC, and MIT. In 2006, he co-hosted the annual Game Developers Choice Awards with Tommy Tallarico.

In November 2008, Perry co-founded Gaikai in the Netherlands, a company that released game streaming technology in late 2009. In July 2012, Gaikai was sold to Sony Computer Entertainment for $380 million.

In January 2016, Perry confirmed that he and Michael Jackson had been discussing making a video game together prior to the singer's death.

In July 2017 Perry left Gaikai, joining startup GoVYRL, Inc. to build new technology for brands to work with influencers; the technology is called Carro. GoVYRL, Inc. has seed investments from entities including The Cove Fund, Brendan Iribe and Alpha Edison.

== Games ==
Description	Year	Publisher
National ZX80/ZX81 Users Club Magazine	1982	Interface Publications
Tim Hartnell's Giant Book of Spectrum Games	1983	Interface Publications
49 Explosive Games for the ZX Spectrum	1983	Interface Publications
Astounding Arcade Games for your Spectrum + & Spectrum	1984	Interface Publications
Sord M5 Graphics Demos [written in BASIC]	1982	Sord
Drakmaze		Mikro-Gen
Herbert's Dummy Run		Mikro-Gen
Great Gurianos ZX Spectrum version	1987	Elite Systems
Three Weeks in Paradise	1986	Mikro-Gen
Stainless Steel		Mikro-Gen
Beyond the Ice Palace	1988	Elite Systems
Savage		via Probe Software -> Go / US Gold
Tintin on the Moon		via Probe Software -> Infogrames
Trantor: The Last Stormtrooper		Probe Software
Paperboy 2 (conversion)		Mindscape
Captain Planet		Mindscape
Teenage Mutant Ninja Turtles	1990	via Probe Software -> Mirrorsoft / Konami
Smash TV (arcade conversion)	1990	via Probe Software -> Ocean Software
Dan Dare III - The Escape		via Probe Software -> Virgin Games
Extreme		Digital Integration
Supremacy (UK) / Overlord (US)	1990	via Probe Software -> Virgin Games
The Terminator	1992	via Probe Software -> Virgin Games
McDonald's Global Gladiators	1992	Virgin Games
7-UP's Cool Spot	1993	Virgin Games
Disney's Aladdin	1993	Virgin Games
Earthworm Jim	1994	Playmates Interactive
Earthworm Jim 2	1995	Playmates Interactive
MDK	1997	Playmates Interactive / Interplay
Wild 9	1998	Interplay
RC Stunt Copter	1999	Titus Interactive
Messiah	2000	Interplay
Sacrifice	2000	Interplay
Enter the Matrix	2003	Atari
The Matrix: Path of Neo	2005	Atari
2Moons		Acclaim
9 Dragons		Acclaim
Dance Online		Acclaim
Ponystars		Acclaim
Kogamu		Acclaim
Rockfree		Acclaim
Prize Potato		Acclaim
Spellborn		Acclaim

=== Books ===
- David Perry on Game Design. Delmar, 2009 ISBN 978-1584506683
