= Transformers vs. The Terminator =

Comic book limited series

- Cover to Transformers vs. The Terminator #1. Art by Francesco Francavilla.

Publication information
- Publisher: IDW Publishing; Dark Horse Comics
- Format: Limited series
- Genre: Crossover; Science fiction
- Publication date: March 25 – September 30, 2020
- No. of issues: 4
- Main character(s): Transformers (Hasbro); Terminator (StudioCanal)

Creative team
- Created by: John Barber; David Mariotte; Tom Waltz
- Written by: John Barber; David Mariotte
- Penciller: Alex Milne
- Letterer: Jake M. Wood
- Colorist: David García Cruz
- Editor(s): Megan Brown; Riley Farmer; Tom Waltz

Transformers vs. The Terminator is an American comic book limited series published on 2020 by IDW Publishing and Dark Horse Comics. It is a crossover event between the Transformers franchise, owned by Hasbro, and the Terminator franchise, currently owned by StudioCanal.

== Premise ==
In the year 2029, the Earth has been laid to waste, ravaged by the Decepticons after their complete victory over the Autobots. To prevent this from occurring and ensure their own dominance, Skynet sends a lone T-800 unit back in time to 1984 to destroy the dormant Cybertronians and save the future.

== Publication history ==
Transformers vs. The Terminator is produced by IDW Publishing in partnership with Dark Horse Comics, current license holder of the Terminator franchise.

Co-writer and IDW's Editor-in-Chief John Barber said “I still remember the visceral thrill and terror of my first viewing of The Terminator, and while I've seen it a hundred times since then, it still gets my pulse running. I've worked on Transformers a lot over the years, and the opportunity to combine these two mechanistic universes together to see who comes out on top (while working alongside Tom, David, and my old collaborator Alex, no less) —well, it's way too exciting a chance to pass up.”

Artist Alex Milne said “Transformers was a large part of my childhood; I was captivated, wanting to see how Optimus Prime would foil the plans of Megatron. Later, I came across The Terminator and was amazed by the idea of a robot pretending to be a human, sent back in time to hunt down a specific target. Now, as an adult, I'm very pleased to lend my talents to a project which sees these sci-fi icons brought together!”

== Characters ==
Transformers characters	Terminator characters
Autobots: Arcee; Bumblebee; Cosmos; Gears; Glyph; Huffer; Jazz; Mirage; Optimus Prime; Powerglide; Prowl; Ratchet; Sideswipe; Trailbreaker; Velocity; Wheeljack; Decepticons: Bombshell; Kickback; Megatron; Ravage; Refraktor; Skrapnel; Skywarp; Soundwave; Starscream; Thundercracker	Sarah Connor; Skynet; T-800

== Issues ==
Issue	Title	Written by	Drawn by	Colored by	Lettered by	Publication date
1	"Enemy of My Enemy, Part 1"	John Barber and David Mariotte	Alex Milne	David García Cruz	Jake M. Wood	March 25, 2020
2	"Enemy of My Enemy, Part 2"	John Barber and David Mariotte	Alex Milne	David García Cruz	Jake M. Wood	June 24, 2020
3	"Enemy of My Enemy, Part 3"	John Barber and David Mariotte	Alex Milne	David García Cruz	Jake M. Wood	August 19, 2020
4	"Enemy of My Enemy, Part 4"	John Barber and David Mariotte	Alex Milne	David García Cruz	Jake M. Wood	September 30, 2020

== Reception ==
Issue	Publication date	Critic rating	Critic reviews	Ref.
1	March 25, 2020	7.2/10	9	
2	June 24, 2020	7.0/10	5	
3	August 19, 2020	6.3/10	4	
4	September 30, 2020	6.6/10	3	
Overall	—N/a	6.8/10	21	

== Collected editions ==
Title	Material collected	Pages	Publication date	ISBN
Transformers vs. The Terminator	Transformers vs. The Terminator #1−4	96	November 25, 2020	1684057256, 978-1684057252
