= Tommy Tallarico =

American video game composer (born 1968)

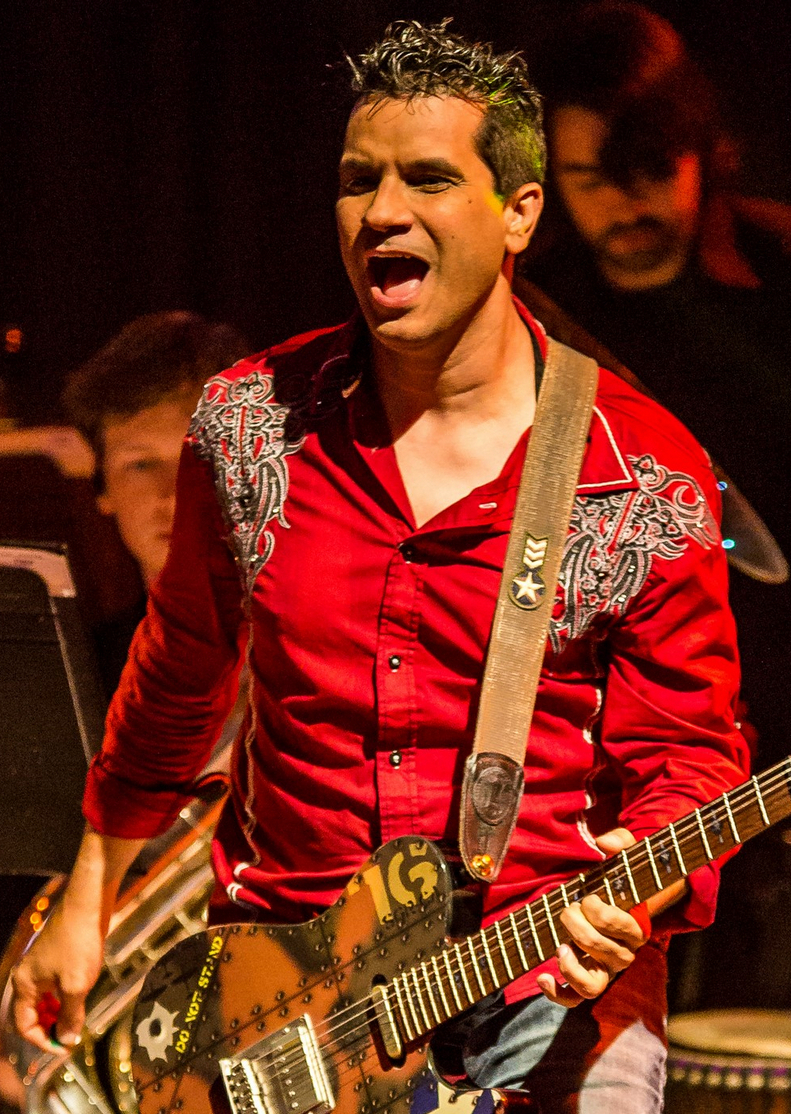
- Tallarico performing with Video Games Live in 2016

Background information
- Born: February 18, 1968 (age 58); Springfield, Massachusetts, U.S.
- Genres: Video game music; symphonic; rock
- Occupations: Video game music composer; television producer; television presenter
- Instrument: Guitar
- Years active: 1991–present
- Member of: Video Games Live
- Website: tallarico.com

Tommy Tallarico (born February 18, 1968) is an American video game music composer, sound designer, and television producer. Since the 1990s, his company Tommy Tallarico Studios has produced audio for many video games. He co-hosted the television series Electric Playground and Reviews on the Run from 1997 until 2006. In 2002, he created Video Games Live (VGL), a concert series featuring orchestral performances of video game music.

In 2018, Tallarico acquired the Intellivision brand and formed a new company called Intellivision Entertainment, which began developing a new video game console named the Intellivision Amico. Tallarico frequently appeared in pitch videos to solicit investors for the Amico project. He has since stepped down from his position as CEO but remains on the company's board as president. As of 2026, the console has not been released.

In 2019, it came to Tallarico's attention that a sound effect used in the online game platform Roblox, widely known as the "oof", had been created by Tommy Tallarico Studios and legally belonged to him. This led to a legal dispute which ended in 2022 with the removal of the sound effect from the game. Later in 2022, a video essay by British YouTuber Hbomberguy documented many dubious claims that Tallarico had made about his own career, including his alleged involvement in creating the "oof" sound.

== Early life ==
Tommy Tallarico was born on February 18, 1968, and grew up in Springfield, Massachusetts and attended Cathedral High School. He told The Washington Post that as a child, he would take his father's tape recorder to the arcade to record songs. After graduating high school, Tallarico attended Western New England University for a year. According to the Los Angeles Times, Tallarico moved to Southern California in 1991 to try and obtain a job in the video game industry. Tallarico took a job as a keyboard salesman at a Guitar Center in Santa Ana, California. On his first day, Tallarico met an executive from Virgin Mastertronic. Shortly after, he was given a job at Virgin as one of their play-testers.

== Career ==
Tallarico's first musical project at Virgin Interactive was for the Game Boy version of Prince of Persia. "The main focus of writing video game music back then was it had to be simple and have a great melody," Tallarico said. Tallarico worked on a number of other games while at Virgin Interactive, including the Sega CD version of The Terminator.

=== Tommy Tallarico Studios ===
Tallarico continued working with Virgin Interactive as head of music and video division until 1994, when he went on to found Tommy Tallarico Studios. David Perry formed Shiny Entertainment at the same time, and the two studios collaborated on Earthworm Jim and MDK. In 2005, Tallarico wrote part of an orchestral score for Advent Rising performed by the Mormon Tabernacle Choir.

In September 1999, the "oof" sound effect was created for the game Messiah, by sound designer Joey Kuras, a Tallarico Studios employee, and possibly by Tallarico himself. Tallarico has at times claimed that Kuras created the sound, that it was a collaboration between the pair, and that he created it himself. In 2006, the same audio was used in the online game platform Roblox as the default sound effect that played when a player character died, and later became iconic in meme culture due to its usage in Roblox. Tallarico, who claims ownership of the sound, disputed Roblox's use of it in June 2019. This dispute ended in July 2022 when the Roblox Corporation pulled the sound effect from all games on its platform.

=== Television ===
In 1997, Victor Lucas, founder of the Electric Playground, started Electric Playground TV with Tallarico, which provided gaming news and reviews. In 2002, the review segment of Electric Playground, titled Reviews on the Run, was spun off into an independent television series, with Tallarico and Lucas continuing in their roles. In the U.S., Reviews on the Run was broadcast on G4 TV as Judgment Day. In 2006, Tallarico began to spend less time on the show owing to other projects, missing almost all of 2007 and 2008. In 2009, Scott Jones took over his spot as full-time co-host with Victor Lucas.

=== Concerts ===
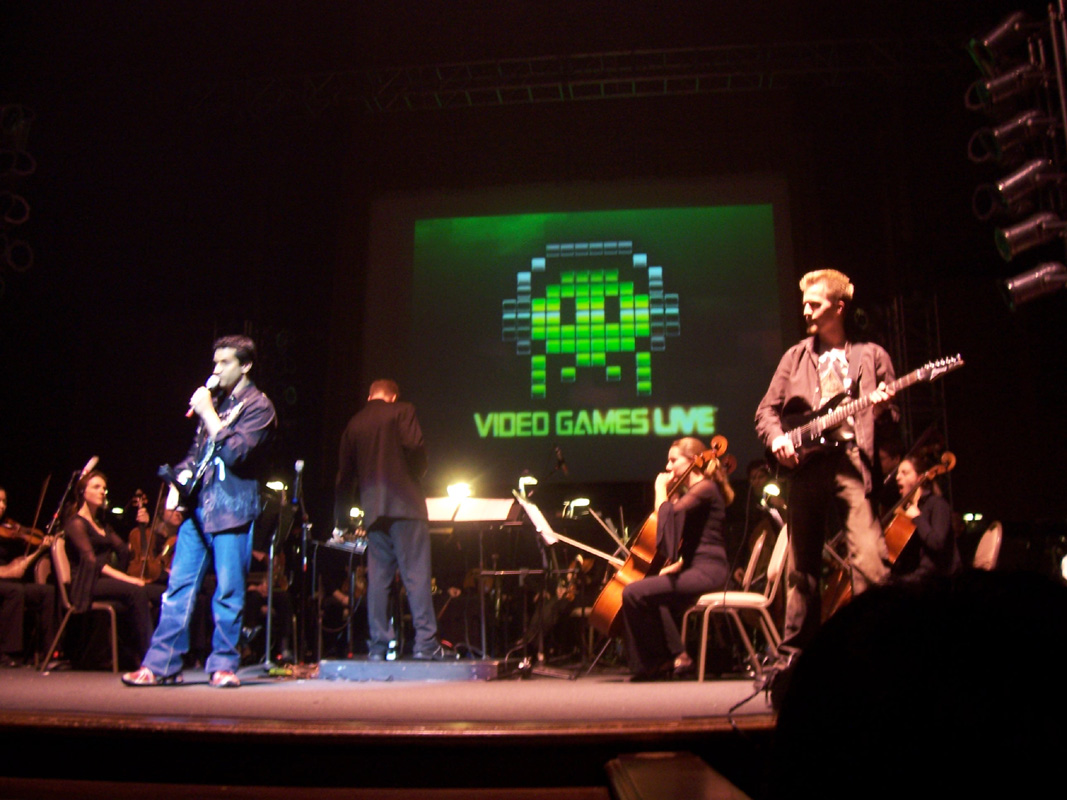
Tallarico (left) addressing the audience at Video Games Live 2007

In 2002, Tallarico co-founded Video Games Live, a symphony orchestra concert series that plays music from video games, with Jack Wall. Tallarico hosted and played guitar for the shows. He also created the visuals—scenes from video games, as well as lights and lasers—that are played in sync with the music.

Tallarico has produced seven VGL albums. The first album, Video Games Live Volume 1, debuted at No. 10 on Billboard Top 10 for Classical Music Crossovers. The second volume, Level 2, also sold as a Blu-ray DVD concert, debuted at No. 8 on the same Billboard list. In August 2013, Tallarico also opened a crowdfunding campaign for the third album Level 3 on Kickstarter. According to Tallarico, he chose to fund the album through Kickstarter because he had not been successful in attracting support from the recording industry, which he claimed was because music producers "don't think gamers are willing to pay for music" and did not recognize the perceived "culturally artistic significance" of video game soundtracks. The Level 3 campaign successfully met and surpassed its goal of $250,000.

In 2014, Tallarico and electronic dance music artist BT began working on Electronic Opus. As with Video Games Live, Electronic Opus presents EDM music alongside a symphony orchestra. They used Kickstarter to fund an album, with a goal of $200,000. The show opened at the Miami Winter Music Conference in 2015. In 2016, Tallarico co-produced the Capcom Live! concert tour with Shota Nakama.

In 2024, video game music composer Laura Intravia accused Tallarico of selling music arrangements from Video Games Live concerts that he did not own the rights to.

=== Intellivision Entertainment ===
Following the death of Intellivision Productions founder Keith Robinson in 2017, Tallarico purchased a stake in the company from the Robinson estate. In May 2018, Intellivision Entertainment was re-formed with him as president. In the winter of that year, he announced that the company would create the Intellivision Amico with a release date of October 2020.

By September 2022, the Amico had been delayed at least three times. The console has been viewed very negatively by critics, drawing criticism for its delays, fundraising tactics, and use of NFTs. The status of the console has been described as "grim" by TechRaptor and compared to a car crash by Kotaku.

In February 2022, Tallarico stepped down from his role as CEO of Intellivision, remaining on board as the company's president and largest shareholder. He was replaced by the company's former chief revenue officer Phil Adam. As of 2026, the Amico has not been released.

=== Game Audio Network Guild ===
In 2002, Tallarico founded the Game Audio Network Guild (G.A.N.G.), a non-profit to recognize achievements in video game music and audio, and served as its CEO and chairman of the board. The guild hosts annual awards for achievement in game audio.

=== Misleading claims ===
In November 2022, British YouTuber Hbomberguy published a video essay which documented many of the grandiose claims that Tallarico had made concerning his career—including the number of video games he worked on, the number of Guinness World Records he earned, being the creator of the "oof" sound effect in his Roblox legal dispute, being featured on MTV Cribs, and being the first American to work on the Sonic the Hedgehog franchise—and concluded many were either exaggerations or knowingly false.

=== Backgammon ===
Following his tenure as Intellivision CEO and president, and the death of his father, Tallarico participated in a number of backgammon tournaments, sometimes under the name Sammy Salazar. He won the 2024 Backgammon Intermediate Championship in Monte Carlo.

== Personal life ==
Tallarico has stated that he is vegan and an advocate for PETA. In 2010, he donated music to the PETA browser game Super Tofu Boy.

According to the LA Times, his home in San Juan Capistrano "looks as if a 12-year-old with a huge bank account went wild", including life-size statues of Indiana Jones, several Star Wars characters, and Merlin. Tallarico has falsely claimed that the house had been featured on MTV Cribs. In February 2024, he listed it for sale for $2,999,000; real estate broker Redfin reported the house as having been sold on September 25 of that year for $2,700,000.

== Video games ==
=== Tommy Tallarico ===
| Year | Title | Role(s) | Notes | Ref. |
|---|---|---|---|---|
| 1991 | Chuck Rock | Testing | | |
| 1991 | Robin Hood: Prince of Thieves | Quality assurance | Game Boy version | |
| 1992 | Prince of Persia | Music and SFX | Game Boy version | |
| 1992 | Jeep Jamboree: Off Road Adventure | | Game Boy version | |
| 1992 | Greg Norman's Golf Power | Product manager, assistant manual editor | | |
| 1992 | M.C. Kids | Quality assurance | | |
| 1992 | Mick & Mack as the Global Gladiators | Music, sound FX and samples | Sega Genesis version | |
| 1992 | Batman: Revenge of the Joker | Music and sound | Sega Genesis version | |
| 1993 | Another World | Music and sound | Sega Genesis version | |
| 1993 | The Terminator | Director of music and FX | With Brad Fiedel, Bijan Shaheer, Joey Kuras and TeknoMan of Teknologic | |
| 1993 | Cool Spot | Music, SFX and samples | Sega Genesis and Super NES versions | |
| 1993 | RoboCop versus The Terminator | Director of music and FX | Sega Genesis version | |
| 1993 | Color a Dinosaur | Music and sound | | |
| 1993 | Super Slap Shot | Music and sound | | |
| 1994 | Disney's Aladdin | Music | With Donald Griffn and Alan Menken | |
| 1994 | Earthworm Jim: Special Edition | Music and SFX | With Mark Miller | |
| 1994 | The Jungle Book | Director of music and FX | With several others | |
| 1995 | Madden NFL 96 | Music and sound | | |
| 1995 | Earthworm Jim 2 | Music and sound | With Tony Bernetich and Christopher Beck | |
| 1995 | Jim Lee's WildC.A.T.S: Covert Action Teams | Music and sound | | |
| 1997 | The 7th Guest | Sound | With Steve Henifin | |
| 2000 | Messiah | Music and sound effects | With Jesper Kyd and Joey Kuras | |
| 2000 | Spider-Man | Music | With Howard Ulyate | |
| 2000 | Sacrifice | Sound effects | With Joey Kuras | |
| 2000 | Evil Dead: Hail to the King | Music composer, producer and audio production coordinator | With Todd Dennis, Chris Rickwood, and Jack Wall as well as Forte Music | |
| 2003 | Black & Bruised | Voice over producer | | |
| 2003 | Devastation | Additional tracks | | |
| 2003 | Fugitive Hunter: War on Terror | Contributed songs | | |
| 2003 | SpyHunter 2 | Cinematic sound design & composition | With Joey Kuras & Howard Ulyate | |
| 2004 | The Bard's Tale | Music, lyrics, sound design | With various others | |
| 2004 | The X-Files: Resist or Serve | Audio director | | |
| 2005 | Advent Rising | Audio director | | |
| 2006 | Snoopy vs. the Red Baron | Music and sound design | With Joey Kuras and Scott Ligon | |
| 2006 | Pac-Man World Rally | Score | With Joey Kuras | |
| 2009 | Sonic and the Black Knight | Music, arrangements | With Howard Drossin, Richard Jacques, Jun Senoue and others | |
| 2010 | Flip's Twisted World | Audio design | With Joey Kuras | |
| 2010 | Super Tofu Boy | Music donation | | |

=== Tommy Tallarico Studios ===
| Year | Title | Role(s) | Staff credited and other people involved | Ref. |
|---|---|---|---|---|
| 1996 | Black Dawn | Music and sound effects | Todd Dennis | |
| 1996 | Skeleton Warriors | Music and FX | Todd Dennis, Jean-Christoph Beck, and Eric Swanson | |
| 1998 | Apocalypse | In-game sound effects and cut-scene audio | | |
| 1999 | Redline | Music | | |
| 1999 | Knockout Kings 2000 | Sound design | Joey Kuras | |
| 1999 | Tomorrow Never Dies | Music and sound FX | | |
| 1999 | Unreal Mission Pack I: Return to Na Pali | Sound | Alexander Brandon and Eric Heberling | |
| 2000 | Spider-Man | Sound | Joey Kuras | |
| 2001 | Casper: Spirit Dimensions | Sound and voices | Joey Kuras | |
| 2001 | Time Crisis: Project Titan | Music and sound FX | | |
| 2002 | Scooby-Doo! Night of 100 Frights | Music and sound FX | Joey Kuras (sound design) | |
| 2003 | War of the Monsters | Sound FX | | |
| 2004 | The Incredibles | Sound FX design | With Nathan Lee Smith | |
| 2004 | The Bard's Tale | Audio | | |
| 2004 | Fugitive Hunter: War on Terror | Audio direction, sound FX | Joey Kuras | |
| 2004 | The X-Files: Resist or Serve | Sound design and foley | Joey Kuras (sound design), Mike Tallarico (voice over editing) | |
| 2005 | Advent Rising | Audio and score composition | Joey Kuras (sound design), Michael Richard Plowman, Emmanuel Fratianni | |
| 2006 | Jaws: Unleashed | Music | | |
| 2006 | Pac-Man World Rally | Music | | |

== Albums ==
| Year | Title | Notes | Ref. |
|---|---|---|---|
| 1994 | Virgin Games Greatest Hits, Vol. 1 | Compilation of tracks from various games | |
| 1996 | Games Greatest Hits, Vol. 2 | Compilation of tracks from various games | |
| 2006 | Earthworm Jim Anthology | Compilation of music from Earthworm Jim with remixes | |
| 2011 | Play for Japan: The Album | Charity album. Tallarico contributed the song "Greater Lights" from Advent Rising. | |
