= The Terminator (Sega CD video game) =

1993 video game

- European box art
- Developer: Virgin Games
- Publisher: Virgin Games
- Producers: Erik Yeo; Neil Young; Stephen Clarke-Willson; Tom Gibson; Barry Pringle Sr.
- Designers: Erik Yeo; Tom Tanaka; Douglas Cope; Silas Warner
- Programmer: Silas Warner
- Artist: Nick Bruty
- Writers: Erik Yeo; Justin Norr
- Composers: Tommy Tallarico; Brad Fiedel; Bijan Shaheer; Joey Kuras; TeknoMan
- Series: Terminator
- Platform: Sega CD
- Release: NA: June 1993; PAL: February 1994
- Genres: Platform, shoot 'em up
- Mode: Single-player

The Terminator is a 1993 platform/shoot 'em up game developed and published by Virgin Games for the Sega CD. It is based on the 1984 film of the same name, and includes full-motion video from the film. The game was praised for its graphics and Tommy Tallarico's soundtrack, although the film footage was considered low quality and the gameplay also received some criticism.

== Gameplay ==
Gameplay screenshot

The Terminator is a platform and shoot 'em up game with 10 levels. The player controls soldier Kyle Reese and travels through a Skynet facility during the first four levels, set in 2029. After battling Skynet's Terminator machines, Kyle finds a time machine and travels to Los Angeles 1984, where the remainder of the game takes place. Kyle locates Sarah Connor and protects her from the Terminator, a machine sent from the future by Skynet. The Terminator is tasked with killing Sarah, preventing her future son John Connor from leading the human resistance against Skynet. The player can use various weapons and has unlimited ammunition. The player can crouch, jump, and shoot in multiple directions.

== Development and release ==
Although the game is based on the film, creative license was taken to give more variation in the gameplay. The graphics and music took advantage of the Sega CD's capabilities, and the game includes the use of digitized full-motion video (FMV) from the film. The FMV scenes appear in between levels to advance the story.

The game utilized QSound. The soundtrack, consisting of hard rock, pop and techno music, was composed and recorded by Tommy Tallarico, with additional songs contributed by Brad Fiedel ("The Terminator Theme"), Bijan Shaheer ("Future Shock"), Joey Kuras ("Visions") and TeknoMan of Teknologic ("CyberTek"). Tallarico said the game's graphics "were still very much 16-bit-looking and the music you'd hear would be like music on the radio or on an album – and it was a bit jarring. So I would get into screaming matches with the producers because they told me they didn't want that proper music in the game. They said it doesn't sound like a videogame and I said exactly – it doesn't have to any more!"

The Terminator was first released in North America in June 1993. It was originally scheduled for release in Europe the same month, but was delayed due to changes at Virgin. It was eventually released in Europe in February 1994, six months later than initially scheduled.

== Reception ==
Reception

Review scores
| Publication | Score |
|---|---|
| AllGame | 4/5 |
| Consoles + | 87% |
| Game Players | 62% |
| Jeuxvideo.com | 18/20 |
| Joypad | 86% |
| Player One | 80% |
| Video Games (DE) | 54% |
| Game Power | 78/100 |
| Mega | 67% |
| MegaForce | 85% |
| MegaTech | 69% |
| Sega Power | 58% |
| Sega Zone | 65% |
| Supersonic | 92% |

The Terminator was praised for its graphics and its inclusion of FMV, although the latter was also criticized for its poor quality. Paul Pettengale of Sega Power wrote, "The images are so grainy, and the colours so fuzzy, looking too hard at these bits could be bad for your eyes". The soundtrack was praised. GamePro stated that the "catchy music fits the action well".

Some reviewers were critical of the gameplay. Julian Connolly of MegaTech felt that the game had no longterm value, concluding that it "looks great, sounds great, plays great for a while but all this shooting wears you down". Pettengale found the gameplay unoriginal and wrote "not even a superb soundtrack can save a game when it's had so little thought put into it". Paul Mellerick of Mega was disappointed by the linear level design and concluded, "A well-presented blast, but ultimately boring, very samey and a bit of a waste". David Roberts of Sega Zone found the game to be lacking variety. Game Players considered it an average platform game.

In a later review for AllGame, Shawn Sackenheim praised the "bleak" and "dreary" graphics, stating that they "lend themselves nicely to the mood of the game". He also praised Tallarico's score, writing that it added "a ton to the impact of the graphics and the mood of each level". Sackenheim concluded, "While it may not have been the best looking action/platformer around, it could definitely give any other game a run for its money". Jeuxvideo reviewed the game in 2010, praising the soundtrack and controls.
