= Super Slap Shot =

1993 video game

- North American cover art
- Developer(s): Ringler Studios
- Publisher(s): NA: Virgin Games; JP: Altron
- Composer(s): Tommy Tallarico
- Platform(s): SNES/SFC
- Release: NA: August 1993; JP: August 20, 1993
- Genre(s): Traditional ice hockey simulation
- Mode(s): Single-player; Multiplayer

Super Slap Shot is a traditional five-on-five ice hockey video game for the Super NES/Super Famicom.

== Summary ==
The game itself was endorsed by "Mr. Hockey" Gordie Howe. Although the cover image depicts Cam Neely in a Boston Bruins jersey, though with the number "8" in the place of the letter B on the logo of the jersey, and Dave Christian in the Washington Capitals jersey, no licenses from real-life professional league are used in the game. There are 16 international teams are available to choose from in exhibition and tournament modes. These teams include the United States, Sweden, Russia, and Canada. There are more than ten pages of hockey stats to look up in a typical game. Realistic penalties are given and fighting is given an up-close view.

Besides the national teams, the player can also choose the Cities mode on options and play with teams representing North American franchises, possibly inspired by the NHL. By the time the game was released, all of the cities available had NHL franchises. Some of them bear the same colors of their real-life counterparts. For instance, Los Angeles plays in black and white like the Kings, Calgary wears red like the Flames, Chicago has red and black uniforms like the Blackhawks, Detroit gear is red like Red Wings', Pittsburgh uses a black and white equipment with gold details like the Penguins, the New York team is blue just like the Rangers and Quebec is white and blue like the Nordiques. The Philadelphia team was branded just as Philly while the New Jersey one is called simply N.J.

The game was designed by Ed Ringler, who had previously worked in Mario Lemieux Hockey for Sega Genesis and contributed with several other ice hockey videogames.

== Reception ==
Power Unlimited gave this game an official rating of 75% in their November 1993 issue, they went on to summarize the game saying: "The ice hockey action in Super Slapshot is intense and the speed gives you the sensation of real ice. The biggest drawback is the weak controls. It is very difficult to get used to that. This game is especially fun for two people." while German based Total! magazine gave this game a rating of 3.25 out of 6.
