= R/C Stunt Copter =

1999 video game

- North American cover art
- Developers: Shiny Entertainment; Big Grub
- Publishers: NA: Titus Interactive; EU: Interplay Entertainment
- Platform: PlayStation
- Release: NA: September 1, 1999; EU: 1999
- Genre: Amateur flight simulator
- Modes: Single-player, multiplayer

R/C Stunt Copter is a video game developed by Shiny Entertainment with Big Grub for PlayStation in 1999.

== Development ==
R/C Stunt Copter was originally announced under the title "Fly by Wire". David Perry decided to create the game because flying a radio-controlled helicopter is something most males would like to do but could not afford to.

Mathematician Robert Suh modeled the radio-controlled helicopter and its flight mechanics, using a book of equations for flight models as a reference. The game was designed specifically for the PlayStation's Dual Analog Controller.

== Reception ==
Reception

Aggregate score
Aggregator	Score
GameRankings	76%

Review scores
Publication	Score
AllGame	4/5
CNET Gamecenter	5/10
Edge	4/10
Electronic Gaming Monthly	7.375/10 (Note: Two critics of Electronic Gaming Monthly gave the game each a score of 7/10, one gave it 8/10, and the other gave it 7.5/10.)
Famitsu	26/40
Game Informer	7/10
GameFan	90% (Note: In GameFan's viewpoint of the game, three critics gave it each a score of 90, 87, and 92.) (G.N.) 83%
GameSpot	7.2/10
IGN	8.8/10
Next Generation	4/5
Official U.S. PlayStation Magazine	4/5

The game received favorable reviews according to the review aggregation website GameRankings. Chris Charla of NextGen said of the game, "A unique game with unique control, this game is a winner." In Japan, where the game was ported and published by Taito on November 30, 2000, Famitsu gave it a score of 26 out of 40.

Four-Eyed Dragon of GamePro said, "If you're an RC hobbyist or a flight-sim fan, R/C Stunt Copter is great to play; otherwise, rent the game for a quick test flight." (Note: GamePro gave the game two 3.5/5 scores for graphics and fun factor, 3/5 for sound, and 4/5 for control.)
