= The Lion King (video game) =

1994 video game

- North American Genesis box art
- Developer: Westwood Studios (Note: MS-DOS version developed by East Point Software; Game Gear and Master System versions developed by Syrox Developments; Game Boy and NES versions developed by Dark Technologies.)
- Publisher: Virgin Interactive Entertainment
- Director: Louis Castle
- Composer: Matt Furniss: Super NES Frank Klepacki Dwight Okahara John Wright Zack Bremner Patrick Collins MS-DOS, Amiga Allister Brimble Game Boy, NES Kevin Bateson
- Series: The Lion King
- Platforms: Genesis/Mega Drive, Game Gear, Master System, Super NES, Game Boy, MS-DOS, Amiga, NES
- Release: November 4, 1994: Genesis/Mega Drive; EU: November 4, 1994; NA: November 9, 1994 (Note: Reported in-stores date varies; sources either suggest October 31 or November 1. The in-stores date is different from the reported "street" or release date, November 9.) Game Gear; EU: November 4, 1994; NA: November 9, 1994 Master System; EU: November 4, 1994 Super NES; NA: November 9, 1994; EU: November 11, 1994 Game Boy; EU: December 8, 1994; NA: April 1995 MS-DOS; NA: 1994; EU: 1994 Amiga; EU: 1994 NES; EU: May 25, 1995
- Genre: Platform
- Mode: Single-player

The Lion King is a 1994 platform game based on Disney's 1994 animated film of the same name. It was originally developed by Westwood Studios and published by Virgin Interactive Entertainment for the Super NES and Sega Genesis, and was ported to MS-DOS, Amiga, Game Gear, Master System, and Nintendo Entertainment System; the Amiga, Master System, and NES versions were only released in the PAL region. The game follows Simba's journey from a young cub to the battle with his uncle Scar as an adult.

== Gameplay ==
The Lion King is a side-scrolling platformer where the player controls Simba, in the events of the film, going through both child and adult forms as the game progresses. In the first half of the game, players control Simba as a cub, who mainly defeats enemies by jumping on them. Simba's roar consumes a replenishable meter, and can be used to stun enemies or solve puzzles. In the second half of the game, Simba becomes an adult and gains access to various combat moves such as scratching, mauling, and throws. Simba starts the game with a certain number of lives, depending on the difficulty setting, which are lost if he runs out of health, falls into a bottomless pit, or a lake of water or lava, or is hit by a rolling boulder or falling stalactites. Passing through checkpoints throughout the level allow Simba to restart from that point when he loses a life. The game ends prematurely when the player loses all of their lives. If players have any continues left (collected via a Circle of Life icon in any stage), they can restart from the beginning of the last stage they got a Game Over on. Otherwise, it's back to the title screen and starting over from the beginning.

The player can collect various types of bugs. Some bugs restore Simba's health, other rarer bugs can increase both the health and roar meters for the remainder of the game, and black spiders will damage Simba. By finding certain bugs hidden in specific levels, the player enters bonus stages as Timon and Pumbaa to earn extra lives and continues. In Pumbaa's stages, he collects falling bugs and items until either one hits the bottom of the screen or he eats a bad bug. In Timon's stages, he hunts for bugs within a time limit while avoiding spiders. Every 10 bugs Timon eats will net the player extra lives, continues, or rarely, some health and roar extension bugs.

== Development ==
The sprites and backgrounds were drawn by Disney animators at Walt Disney Feature Animation, and the music was adapted from songs and orchestrations in the film's soundtrack. Game designer Louis Castle revealed that two levels, Hakuna Matata and Be Prepared, were adapted from scenes which were cut from the final movie. The game's development started in January 1994 and finished in July. Near the end of development, the monkey puzzle in the second level, "Can't Wait to be King", was expanded and made more difficult to meet Disney's playtime criteria to fight game rentals, as time constraints made it impossible to add more levels.

An Amiga 1200 version was developed in assembly language in two months by Dave Semmons, who was willing to take on the conversion if he received the Genesis source code. He had assumed the game to be programmed in 68000 assembly, and the Amiga and Genesis share the same Motorola CPU family, but he found it had been written in C, a language he was unfamiliar with.

Westwood Studios developed the game for the Super NES and Genesis. Other conversions were outsourced to different studios. East Point Software ported it to MS-DOS, adding enhanced sound effects and music. The Master System and Game Gear versions were developed by Syrox Developments, and the NES and Game Boy versions were developed by Dark Technologies. The 1995 European NES version was that console's last official release in all regions.

The game had a marketing budget of $8 million from a total budget of $20 million.

== Reception ==
Reception

Review scores
Publication	Score
Electronic Gaming Monthly	SGG: 31/40
GameFan	SNES: 268/300
Next Generation	SNES: 4/5
Nintendo Power	SNES: 16.3/20
VideoGames & Computer Entertainment	SMD & SNES: 7/10
Electronic Games	SMD: A
Entertainment Weekly	SMD: B+ SNES: A
GB Action	GB: 85%
Games World	SGG: 85/100
Play Time	PC: 79/100

The Super NES version of The Lion King had 1.27 million copies sold in the United States. More than 200,000 copies of the MS-DOS version were sold. In the United Kingdom, it was the top-selling Sega Master System game in November 1994. It also ranked third on the all-formats console sales chart for Christmas 1994 across its Mega Drive, Super Nintendo, Game Gear and Master System versions. In the United States, it was the top-selling Game Gear game in December 1994. In 2002, Westwood's Louis Castle remarked that roughly 4.5 million copies of The Lion King were sold in total.

GamePro reviewed the SNES version, commenting on outstanding graphics and voices, but "repetitive, tedious gameplay that's too daunting for beginning players and too annoying for experienced ones". They particularly noted the imprecise controls and highly uneven difficulty, though they said the "movie-quality graphics, animations, and sounds" were good enough to make the game worth playing regardless of the gameplay. They similarly remarked of the Genesis version: "The Lion King looks good and sounds great, but the gameplay needs a little more fine-tuning".

The four reviewers of Electronic Gaming Monthly praised the Game Gear version as having graphics equal to, and controls vastly improved over, the SNES and Genesis versions. GamePro wrote that the graphics are not as good as those of the SNES and Genesis versions, but agreed they are exceptional by Game Gear standards, and praised its much more gradual difficulty slope than the earlier versions.

Next Generation rated the SNES version four stars out of five, and stated that "even though the game is much harder than Aladdin, it's never unfair or frustrating".

In 2014, game director Louis Castle revealed that the reason why the game was made difficult, especially in level 2, was due to pressure from Disney so that people would not be able to complete it during the rental period at Blockbusters. He has since apologised for this.

Entertainment Weekly gave the Super NES version an A and the Genesis version a B+ and wrote that "controlling Simba when he's a playful bundle of fur is one thing; putting him through his paces as a full-maned adult is quite another. When the grown-up Simba gives a blood-curdling roar and mauls snarling hyenas, the interaction is so well observed that it's like watching a PBS nature documentary. The sense of power it gives you is exhilarating, and by the time Simba takes his climactic heavyweight stand against his evil uncle Scar, this Lion King has turned into a wild-kingdom variant of Street Fighter II". Super Play gave the Super NES version an overall score of 82/100, praising its graphics and sound as "almost film-like quality" and stating "a very high-quality platformer game with little in the way of innovation".

=== Accolades ===
In 2009, GamesRadar ranked the game seventh on its list of the seven best Disney games, saying "Every intricate level was designed with all the grace and detail of a classic Disney background, plus they managed to make a coherent game that stuck to the plot of the film". In 1996, GamesMaster listed the Mega Drive version 4th in its "The GamesMaster Mega Drive Top 10".

== Legacy ==
The Super NES, Genesis, and Game Boy versions are included with Aladdin as part of Disney Classic Games: Aladdin and The Lion King, released for the Nintendo Switch, PlayStation 4, Windows, and Xbox One on October 29, 2019. The compilation was later updated as Disney Classic Games Collection: Aladdin, The Lion King, and The Jungle Book, which includes the SNES, Genesis, and Game Boy versions of The Jungle Book and the SNES version of Aladdin. It was released on November 23, 2021.

== See also ==
- List of Disney video games
