= The Terminator (Sega video game) =

1992 video game

- European cover art
- Developer: Probe Software
- Publisher: Virgin Games
- Producers: Neil Young; Lyle J. Hall II
- Programmer: David Perry
- Artist: Nick Bruty
- Writer: Neil Young
- Composer: Matt Furniss
- Series: Terminator
- Platforms: Genesis/Mega Drive, Master System, Game Gear
- Release: Genesis/Mega Drive: NA: May 1992; PAL: August 1992; Master System: PAL: August 1992; Game Gear: PAL: 1992; NA: October 1992
- Genres: Platform, shoot 'em up
- Mode: Single-player

The Terminator is a 1992 video game developed by Probe Software and published by Virgin Games for the Sega Genesis, Master System, and Game Gear. It is based on the 1984 film of the same name. The Terminator was praised for its graphics and sound, but criticized for its gameplay.

== Gameplay ==
The Terminator is a platform shoot 'em up game. It takes place across several levels, based on locations from the film. The player takes control of Kyle Reese, a soldier fighting in the human resistance against Skynet and its machine army. In the first level, set in 2029, Kyle must infiltrate a Skynet facility while fighting various machines along the way. He eventually finds a time machine and travels to Los Angeles 1984 to protect Sarah Connor, who one day will give birth to the human resistance leader, John Connor.

At the end of each subsequent level, the player faces off against the Terminator, who has been sent from the future to kill Sarah. The player can use various weapons throughout the game, including grenades and shotguns. During the second level, the player traverses the streets of Los Angeles, encountering enemies such as punks and police officers; the latter cannot be killed. Kyle and Sarah are eventually taken into custody and must escape the police station after the Terminator launches an attack on it. The final level is a battle set in a factory, where the Terminator is crushed by machinery.

== Development and release ==
The Terminator was developed by Probe Software and published by Virgin Games. The game's programmer, David Perry, wanted the player character to be a Terminator. However, the film's distributor, Orion Pictures, mandated that it instead be Kyle Reese, who dies at the end of the film. Orion also requested that there be only one Terminator, who would die only at the end of the game, as in the film. Perry described this as "tremendously frustrating" for players: "they had to play as a man who always dies, and they never get to kill the main enemy until the very end". To create the character movements, Perry and game producer Neil Young were recorded as they performed the moves. The footage was then digitized in black and white onto an Amiga computer. With the use of Deluxe Paint, the actors were separated from the backgrounds and colorized before being added into the game.

In 2003, Perry said about the game: "That was a disaster, because I wasn't allowed to use anything significant from the movie itself. I asked if I could have Arnold Schwarzenegger in the game. No. How about Linda Hamilton, you know, Sarah Conner, the hero? No. How can you have a Terminator game without the two main characters?"

The Genesis version was released in the U.S. in May 1992. The Mega Drive and Master System versions saw a United Kingdom release in August 1992. The Game Gear version would become available in the U.S. that October.

== Reception ==
Reception

Review scores
Publication	Score		
Publication	Game Gear	Master System	Sega Genesis
Computer and Video Games		90/100	91/100
Electronic Gaming Monthly			31/40
GamesMaster	84%		
Zero		80/100	84/100
Game Zone		83/100	79/100
Mean Machines	82%	82%	43%
Mega			71%
MegaTech		60%	
Sega Force	87%	90%	84%
Sega Power	87%	81%	87%
Sega Pro	92/100	90/100	92/100
Sega Zone	80/100		

On the Genesis, The Terminator received praise for its sound and graphics, especially its digitized stills from the film. Mega praised the "lovely dark, moody scenery" and "excellent futuristic" soundtrack. Reviewers also praised the graphics and sounds of the Game Gear and Master System versions.

Critics found the gameplay monotonous, and lacking in variety and replay value. Lord Paul of Game Zone wrote that it "looks great and plays well" but that it is "a bit weak" on gameplay. Mean Machines called it a "potentially superb license ruined by complete lack of long-term appeal", while MegaTech called it a "disappointing interpretation of a great film". However, Martin Pond of Zero considered it a "competent interpretation" of the film. Some reviewers found the Genesis version too easy. Others considered the Game Gear and Master System versions too difficult.
