= RoboCop Versus The Terminator (comics) =

1992 comic book crossover series

- RoboCop Versus The Terminator #1; Art by Walter Simonson.

Publication information
- Publisher: Dark Horse Comics
- Format: Limited series
- Genre: Cyberpunk
- Publication date: May 1, 1992
- No. of issues: 4

Creative team
- Created by: Frank Miller
- Written by: Frank Miller
- Artist: Walter Simonson
- Colorist: Rachelle Menashe

RoboCop Versus The Terminator is a four-issue comic book crossover limited series published in 1992 by Dark Horse Comics. It was written by Frank Miller and drawn by Walt Simonson, and ran for four issues. A crossover between the RoboCop and Terminator franchises, the comic follows RoboCop as he works with a soldier from a Skynet-controlled future to prevent the machines from using him to achieve victory.

The 1993 video game RoboCop Versus The Terminator is based on this comic series.

== Plot ==
As Skynet's machines exterminate the last of humanity, human soldier Florence "Flo" Langer infiltrates their systems and learns Skynet first became self-aware through contact with the cyborg RoboCop, using his human consciousness and ability to interface with machines to gain sentience and spark the nuclear war that leads to Skynet seizing control over Earth. Flo travels back in time to Detroit and kills RoboCop before he can awaken Skynet, which in this story is an orbital defense system, defeating the machines in the future. To prevent their downfall, the machines send three terminators to protect RoboCop, saving him and wounding Flo, ushering in a future where the machines kill all life on Earth and render it into fuel to continue their extermination in space. However, RoboCop realizes their motives and fights back to protect Flo, prompting the terminators to try and merge him with Skynet by force, but they are destroyed in a running battle with RoboCop, Flo, ED-209s, and Dr. Marie Lazarus from RoboCop 3.

Realizing the Skynet-controlled future is a result of him, RoboCop commits suicide, but the machines send two more terminators to ensure his survival by killing Flo and Marie, dismembering RoboCop, and connecting his conscious severed head to Skynet. RoboCop refuses to give in and copies his mind into Skynet's networks, where he is hunted for decades, replicating faster than he can be erased, until he finds a security flaw in a terminator factory and uses it to build himself a new and improved body.

With his new body, RoboCop intercepts and defeats a force of machines sent to kill the remaining humans. He meets Flo, who is alive but never discovered his role in Skynet's sentience in this timeline. When she witnesses him use a terminator factory for repairs, she asks why he would stop with one body; agreeing, RoboCop constructs even more copies of himself, forming a squadron of RoboCops tasked with defeating Skynet for good. RoboCop leads his squadron into Skynet's central cortex but is ensnared by hallucinations and illusions until he sees Flo being mortally wounded; enraged, he connects himself to the machines but commands them to die, defeating Skynet and saving humanity, albeit too late to save Flo, who dies in his arms. Determined to prevent this future from happening in the first place, RoboCop travels back in time, flies into space, and destroys Skynet before it can gain sentience, preventing the events of the comic from happening. In this future, Flo wakes up in a beautiful garden. RoboCop, satisfied, promptly fades from existence, as this version of him would have never existed without Skynet.

In the saved timeline, the existing RoboCop feels an unexplained sense of peace, and decides to return to Detroit Police Department headquarters for a rest. The comic ends as the machines attempt to send one last terminator back in time to kill RoboCop and secure Skynet's future, only for it to overshoot the human era immensely and land in the Mesozoic Era, where it is crushed by a dinosaur.

== Themes ==
The contrast of man and machine is made at several points in the series. Several scenes are narrated from the viewpoint of the machines which describe a lifeless Earth with disgust, at one point monologuing how life "thought its mushy grey brains had conquered the planet" when in fact it was "its endless, sweating spawning. It spawned and spawned, spewing out new flesh faster than the old could die."

== Film adaptation ==
Plans for a Terminator vs Robocop film have been on and off in the works since 1990. Although no movie has yet to be made with the crossover, several video games and comic books have been released based on the idea

== Video game ==
A video game loosely based on the comic was released for the Mega Drive/Genesis, Master System, Super Nintendo Entertainment System, Game Gear, and the Game Boy. A platform game tie-in for the Nintendo Entertainment System was also produced, but was ultimately cancelled; the ROM for it has since been distributed online. The Genesis version was awarded "Bloodiest Game of 1993" by Electronic Gaming Monthly.

== Collected editions ==
The four issues, including stiff cardboard inserts intended as pull-out cut-outs, were bound together with a new cover as an "exclusive" collection by Diamond Comics. This version is long out of print.

In February 2014, Dark Horse announced that two collected editions of the series would be released the following July: a standard hardcover edition, and a "gallery edition" reproducing the original art at full size.

== See also ==
- Terminator/RoboCop: Kill Human
