= Messiah (video game) =

2000 video game

- North American cover art
- Developer: Shiny Entertainment
- Publisher: Interplay Entertainment
- Producer: Stuart Roch
- Designer: David Perry
- Programmer: Michael Saxs Persson
- Composers: Jesper Kyd; Joey Kuras
- Platform: Microsoft Windows
- Release: NA: March 29, 2000; EU: April 4, 2000; UK: April 7, 2000
- Genre: Action-adventure
- Mode: Single-player

Messiah is a 2000 action-adventure video game developed by Shiny Entertainment and published by Interplay Entertainment for Microsoft Windows. The game was promoted for its tessellation technology, which was claimed to drastically increase or reduce the number of polygons based on the speed of the system running the game. Messiah received a mixed response from reviewers.

== Gameplay ==
Messiah is a 3D action game in which the player controls an angel named Bob from the third person. Bob has the ability to possess the bodies of other characters, which serves as a mechanic for progression through the game. When a character is possessed, a halo floats over their head. Bob is able to abandon these bodies, but if spotted, will be attacked by enemies.

== Plot ==
The player controls Bob, an angel sent by God to remove the corruption and sin on Earth. The dictator of Earth, Father Prime, is conducting experiments into other dimensions on the dark side of the Moon. Soon after landing on Earth, Bob's existence is deemed illegal and he finds himself hunted by police, along with the military. Meanwhile, Father Prime's experiments succeed in bringing Satan into the mortal plane. After making his way through the cyberpunk city of Faktur, Bob confronts and defeats Father Prime. Bob is then asked to return by God, telling him that if humans are prepared to tamper with His creations, there is no place for Him on Earth and leave them to their own devices. Bob refuses, and this turns out to be a ruse by Satan to lead the cherub astray.

After making his way through the industrial parts of the city, Bob infiltrates a nuclear power station and transports himself to the facility on the dark side of the Moon, ultimately confronting and banishing Satan, which destroys the facility. The ensuing explosion launches Bob onto a barren part of the Moon. Bob repeatedly implores God to take him home but is met with silence.

== Development ==
Lead designer David Perry intended Messiah to be targeted towards adults, in contrast to Shiny's previous games such as Earthworm Jim, and predominantly towards males. The game was developed by 10 people. The development team heavily touted the game's tessellation technology, which they said could reduce or increase the number of polygons displayed in real time based on the hardware running the game, thereby maximizing the level of detail possible on any given hardware setup, stabilizing the frame rate, and enabling real-time interpolation and volumetric lighting. In a 1997 interview Perry said Shiny had filed for a patent on the technology. The character models were built in 3D Studio and were all animated using motion capture, with a person with dwarfism serving as the motion capture actor for Bob.

In February 1998, a couple years before Messiah was released, the Los Angeles Times reported a public outcry over the title. Perry explained, "It's crazy that all these people are already upset and they haven't even seen the game." Jeff Green of Computer Gaming World stated, "You can't use the word 'messiah' and not know you're going to tweak the sensibilities of the religious community." The developers received upset responses from many Christian organizations as well as consumers, including one that commented, "The word 'messiah' is such a powerful word, I just can't ignore it or its connotations. I know there are a lot of things out there that already tarnish religious imagery. But I just can't support a company that would throw around that word so lightly."

In August 1999, Interplay recorded several promotional commercials with Hank the Angry Drunken Dwarf from The Howard Stern Radio Show. Hank would don an angel costume and wandered the streets of various cities with a sign to publicly promote the game. Songs by the band Fear Factory are used in the game's soundtrack and the game makes use of sound effects by composers Tommy Tallarico and Joey Kuras.

== Reception ==
Reception

Aggregate score
Aggregator	Score
GameRankings	74%

Review scores
Publication	Score
AllGame	3/5
CNET Gamecenter	7/10
Computer Games Strategy Plus	2.5/5
Computer Gaming World	1.5/5
Edge	7.5/10
GameFan	85%
GamePro	4.5/5
GameRevolution	C+
GameSpot	6/10
GameSpy	91%
IGN	7.5/10
Next Generation	3/5
PC Gamer (US)	77%

The game received "average" reviews according to the review aggregation website GameRankings. The earliest review came from Edge, which gave it a score of seven out of ten, nearly two months before the game itself was released in North America, and over two months before its European release date. Computer Gaming World declared the title "truly repellent – I don't even like to think of the sort of sadist who would enjoy it." The review detailed that beside "a level of sexism that goes beyond the usual demeaning stereotypes" and "adolescent edginess" that "there's a general atmosphere of cruelty, of enjoying violence not for the adrenaline rush of the action or even for the fun of cartoonish bloodshed – but for the realistic pain it causes." Jim Preston of NextGen said, "If you can get past some technical glitches, awkward controls, and routine gameplay, Messiah will deliver – for a little while."

According to author Erik Bethke, Messiah was a commercial flop, with "fewer than 10,000 units sold in its first three months". The game was nominated for GameSpot's 2000 "Most Disappointing Game" award, which went to Star Wars: Force Commander.

== Legacy ==
At one point in Messiah, the protagonist makes a vocalization referred to as "oof", which was later used in the game Roblox as the sound effect for when a character dies. The sound became well-known in the Roblox community as a meme. In 2020, there was a legal dispute over the use of the "oof" sound, which led to a compensation agreement between Roblox Corporation and Tommy Tallarico, who created the soundtrack for Messiah. On July 26, 2022, the "oof" sound was removed from Roblox and replaced with a different death sound. The sound effect returned to Roblox in July 2025.
