= Helen Woodward Animal Center =

Animal center located in Rancho Santa Fe, California

Helen Woodward Animal Center (‘HWAC’ or ‘the Center’) is an animal center located in Rancho Santa Fe, California. Located on 12 acres, the Center provides a variety of services that benefit the community through educational and therapeutic programs for people, and humane care and adoption for animals.

== History ==
The Center was established in 1972 as the San Dieguito Animal Care and Education Center with its primary focus on pet adoption and on-site humane education. It was renamed in honor of its founder, Helen Woodward, in 1986. Since its inception, services have grown to include an equine hospital, small animal hospital, boarding facility, animal-assisted therapy outreach, therapeutic horseback riding for the disabled and AniMeals food for pets of the homebound. Education services have expanded to off-site presentations and outreaches.

The Center provides three-day workshops and conferences through The Business of Saving Lives International Conference. The conference provides tips and techniques on managing pet adoptions, public relations, fundraising, humane education, accounting, marketing, human resources and volunteers. Participants have attended from 33 states and 17 locations outside the United States including Argentina, Canada, China, Egypt, Ethiopia, India, Ireland, Iran, Japan, Kenya, Mexico and Romania.

Michael ('Mike') Arms has been CEO and President of Helen Woodward Animal Center since 1999. In October 2007, the Center had to evacuate over 400 animals from their property in the Witch Creek Fire.

In 2013, Mike Arms created an international awareness campaign to remember all animals who never found new homes after landing in shelters. The campaign was called Remember Me Thursday and occurs annually on the fourth Thursday of September.

In May 2014, the center had to evacuate animals from their center during the Bernardo Fire. In 2017, the center created the Pets Without Walls program to help the pets of homeless community members. That same year the president and CEO, Mike Arms, took home a salary of $354,492, compared to the median salary of CEOs of similar sized charities of $148,659. The organization also provided Mike Arms with a home loan amounting to $400,000, as well as paying his membership dues at the University Club in Symphony Towers.

In January 2018, the center began construction on a new adoptions building. The new adoptions building opened to the public on July 17, 2019.

Helen Woodward Animal Center holds an annual fundraising event for surfing dogs and surfing people called the Surf Dog Surf-A-Thon at Dog Beach, in Del Mar, California. This event helps raise awareness and money for animals while promoting responsible pet ownership. The Center also publishes a quarterly newsletter called "The Companion."

In 2020, Helen Woodward Animal Center introduced a program called AniMeals Relief to offer a two-week supply of dog and/or cat food for individuals that have been laid off due to the COVID-19 outbreak. As of June 2020, the program provided more than 42,000 lbs of food to more than 3,000 families in need within San Diego County.

In July 2022, Helen Woodward Animal Center was awarded special consultative status to the Economic and Social Council of the UNITED NATIONS (ECOSOC). In December 2022 and January 2024, president and CEO Mike Arms addressed the council on the importance of advocating for the humane treatment of animals and discovering ways to benefit the community through educational and therapeutic programs for people, while involving animals. Additionally, in 2024, Helen Woodward Animal Center became an accredited organization within the UN Environment Programme.

Some celebrities that support the Center are Kristen Bell, Tippi Hedren, Ryan Newman and his former wife, Krissie.

Helen Woodward Animal Center has been featured on Fox's "All Star Dog Rescue Celebration" (2015) and Hallmark Channel's "American Rescue Dog Show" (2018, 2019, 2020) and People's Celebrity Match Maker (2021, 2022).

=== Blue Buffalo Home 4 The Holidays ===
In 1999, Helen Woodward Animal Center created the Home 4 the Holidays pet adoption campaign including 14 animal shelters in San Diego County, California. The goal of the drive was to reduce euthanasia by encouraging families to adopt a pet rather than purchase a pet from a puppy mill or backyard breeder. During the first campaign, the participating shelters adopted 2,563 orphaned pets. In 2000, the campaign expanded to 5 states, and then expanded both nationally and internationally over the next 13 years. Some Home 4 the Holidays spokespersons include Hilary Swank, Diane Keaton and the canine movie star, Benji. In 2009, the Home 4 the Holidays campaign included participants from more than 3,900 animal organizations in 17 countries, and was featured on the television series The Doctors on October 23, 2009. In 2013, The Blue Buffalo pet food company became the Home 4 the Holidays pet food sponsor.
