= Disney's Aladdin (Genesis video game) =

1993 video game

- North American Genesis box art
- Developer: Virgin Games (Note: Game Boy and NES versions developed by NMS Software; Game Boy Color version developed by Crawfish Interactive.)
- Publisher: Sega (Note: MS-DOS, Amiga, NES, and Game Boy versions published by Virgin Interactive Entertainment; Game Boy version published in North America by THQ; Game Boy Color version published by Ubi Soft.)
- Director: David Perry
- Producers: Robb Alvey; Patrick Gilmore; Sacha Tait
- Designers: David Bishop; Bill Anderson; Tom Tanaka; Seth Mendelsohn
- Programmers: David Perry; John Twiddy (Amiga)
- Artist: Mike Dietz
- Composers: Donald Griffin; Tommy Tallarico
- Series: Aladdin
- Platforms: Genesis, Game Boy, NES, Amiga, MS-DOS, Game Boy Color
- Release: October 19, 1993: Genesis; NA: October 19, 1993; EU: October 22, 1993 Game Boy; EU: September 1994; NA: October 1995 NES; EU: 1994 Amiga; EU: January 1995 MS-DOS; EU: 1995 Game Boy Color; NA: November 15, 2000
- Genre: Platformer
- Mode: Single-player

Disney's Aladdin is a 1993 platform game developed by Virgin Games and published by Sega for the Genesis. It adapts the 1992 Walt Disney Animation Studios film Aladdin. Players control Aladdin as he navigates side-scrolling levels incorporating the film settings and scenarios.

Aladdin was the first Disney video game adaptation developed with Disney's direct involvement. Disney, dissatisfied with the quality of previous adaptations, wanted to match Aladdin's artistic quality. After canceling an initial attempt with BlueSky Software, Disney partnered with Virgin Games, with Sega handling marketing and distribution. Virgin developed digitization techniques to convert Disney's hand-drawn animation to sprites and reproduce Aladdin's style within the technical limits of 16-bit hardware.

Disney's Aladdin was released in October 1993 to coincide with the film's home video release. It received acclaim, particularly for its animation, which critics described as unprecedented in cartridge-based games and closely resembling the film's fluidity. Aladdin sold over four million copies and became one of the bestselling Genesis games. Retrospective reviewers regard it as one of the best platformers and licensed games of the 16-bit era. Its graphical quality prompted the Sega competitor Nintendo to commission Rare to develop the Super Nintendo Entertainment System game Donkey Kong Country (1994), reviving the Donkey Kong franchise.

== Gameplay ==
An example of gameplay from Disney's Aladdin

Disney's Aladdin is a side-scrolling platform game in which the player controls Aladdin throughout settings and a storyline based on the namesake film. Aladdin can slash at enemies at short-range with a scimitar and collect apples throughout the levels to pelt for long-range attacks. Aladdin's health is represented by a trail of smoke emanating from the Genie's lamp on the top-left corner of the screen. The trail shortens whenever Aladdin takes damage from an enemy or environmental hazard. Health can be restored by collecting blue Genie Hearts scattered throughout the levels. If Aladdin runs out of health, a life will be lost. Blue vases within the levels act as checkpoints from which Aladdin will be revived if he had passed one before losing a life. Extra lives can be received by collecting golden icons in the shape of Aladdin's head hidden in the levels. If Aladdin's last life is lost, the player gets a game over. The amount of lives and apples Aladdin is equipped with at the start of the game is determined by the difficulty setting, which can be adjusted in the main menu. Aside from apples, Aladdin can collect gems, which can be traded with the Peddler in each level for extra lives and "wishes." The latter allow the player to continue the game from the current level after losing their last life instead of having to start over from the beginning. On occasion, an area of effect in the form of Jafar's lamp can be found and triggered, which will eliminate all on-screen enemies.

If the player collects one or more Genie Tokens and clears a level, the player will be taken to the "Genie's Bonus Machine," a luck-based minigame in which pressing a button rewards the player with a random prize consisting of a gem, five apples or an extra life. The amount of Genie Tokens collected in a level determines the amount of rounds that can be played in the minigame. When the player runs out of Genie Tokens or if they land on a picture of Jafar, the minigame will end. If the player picks up an Abu Token in two levels, a bonus level featuring Aladdin's pet monkey Abu as the player character will start after the Genie's Bonus Machine. In these levels, the player must maneuver Abu left and right to collect gems, apples, and extra lives that fall to the ground while avoiding pots, rocks, fish, Iago's cousins, palace guards, and other hazards. If Abu comes into contact with a hazard, the bonus level ends.

== Development ==
=== BlueSky Software ===
Disney's Aladdin, a collaboration among Walt Disney Feature Animation, Virgin Games, and Sega of America, marked Disney's first direct involvement in video game development. Disney wanted to improve the quality of its licensed games after dissatisfaction over prior adaptations like the poorly received Fantasia (1991). Aladdin, Disney's 31st animated feature, was a critical and commercial success, grossing over $200 million and introducing a contemporary, cross-generational appeal with humor and references aimed at adults. Disney sought to replicate this quality in its video game adaptation, requiring a developer capable of matching the film's distinctive aesthetic.

Sega and Capcom respectively licensed Aladdin for the Sega Genesis and SNES following the film's theatrical release. BlueSky Software, who had previously developed Ariel the Little Mermaid (1992), was tasked with developing the Sega version. BlueSky's team of approximately eight began work while the film was in theaters, aiming to capitalize on its popularity. However, their progress was hindered by a focus on Jurassic Park (1993), a higher-priority project with a larger team. Disney producer Patrick Gilmore, who was overseeing the license, found BlueSky's progress inadequate, particularly in capturing the film's curvilinear art style, inspired by caricaturist Al Hirschfeld and lead animator Eric Goldberg's work on the Genie. Only one semi-completed level was produced before Disney canceled the project, citing its failure to meet expectations; BlueSky's effort was considered competent but not exceptional. Afterwards, BlueSky added an Easter egg in Jurassic Park as a reference to their role in Aladdin: a Genie's lamp disguised as a mountain range in the in-game map.

=== Virgin Games ===
Disney sought a partner with advanced technology and a commitment to quality animation. At the Consumer Electronics Show (CES), Virgin Games impressed Gilmore with Global Gladiators (1992) and a demo for DynoBlaze, an unproduced concept by Bill Kroyer featuring rollerblading dinosaurs. Virgin's suite of tools and techniques for digitizing hand-drawn animation, which would be marketed as "Digicel", was said by its developers John Alvarado and Andy Luckey to be a major factor in Disney's decision to collaborate with Virgin. A historic three-way agreement was negotiated by Virgin President Martin Alper, leveraging his prior relationship with Sega from distributing Master System products in Europe. Disney would provide animation, Virgin would handle development and digitization, and Sega would manage marketing and distribution, with profits split equally after costs. This deal, finalized in early 1993, required Sega to reassign its license role, as the cancellation of BlueSky's Aladdin left Disney without a Genesis game.

Development began in January 1993, with a team of nine people and a tight six-month timeline to coincide with the film's October 1993 VHS release. Disney's animation team, based at Walt Disney Animation Florida in Orlando, produced 1,400 hand-drawn frames under the direction of Mike Dietz. Disney animators, accustomed to the freedom of feature films, faced cartridge limitations such as restricted frame counts and sprite sizes. Dietz introduced techniques like holds, loops, X-flipping, and palette cycling to fit animations within the Genesis's constraints. Disney provided color copies of the film's backgrounds and character model sheets, though it withheld the film itself and its proprietary Computer Animation Production System (CAPS), which had debuted with The Little Mermaid (1989). CAPS influenced the game's color palette, but digital inking and painting were handled by Metrolight Studios in Los Angeles, with Virgin's Irvine, California team compressing and integrating the assets.

Virgin's game engine was refined from Global Gladiators and The Jungle Book (1994), the latter having been in development before Aladdin. Programmer David Perry, supported by Andy Astor's image-handling tools, optimized the engine for complex animations and introduced a crisscrossing platform system, allowing non-linear level progression. This innovation enhanced gameplay depth with zigzagging paths and hidden spaces. Level designer Bill Anderson created the first level draft in 24 hours and contributed to a design document crafted by Perry, Dietz, David Bishop, Seth Mendelsohn, and Mark Yamada. Disney's Jeffrey Katzenberg, known for micromanaging, contributed ideas like a humorous sight gag where a guard's pants fall to reveal polka-dotted boxer shorts. Disney maintained strict oversight, receiving regular builds via modem for approval.

Virgin Games composer Tommy Tallarico assigned Donald Griffin to arrange five of the film's musical themes, as well as create five original pieces. Griffin would reduce the film's songs to smaller MIDI files and return them to Tallarico, who converted each note by utilizing the sample channel to replicate the film's music as closely as possible, drawing inspiration from Yuzo Koshiro's work on Streets of Rage (1991). Tallarico also composed the game's incidental transition music. Cut content included between-level clips from the film and a rock-paper-scissors mini-game. A planned Sega CD version with additional levels and animations was cancelled in favor of completing production on The Jungle Book.

== Marketing and release ==
The marketing of Disney's Aladdin was a high-profile endeavor, funded by Sega with a $4 million budget. Unveiled at the 1993 Summer CES in Chicago, the game was presented by Katzenberg, Alper, and Sega's Tom Kalinske in a lavish ballroom event featuring costumed dancers, live music, and an Agrabah-themed marketplace. The presentation emphasized the game's groundbreaking animation and Disney's new venture into interactive entertainment.

Sega's marketing campaign included television commercials, media tours in New York and Los Angeles, and promotional pamphlets in Aladdin VHS tapes. As part of their "Sega Scream" campaign, Sega released a 30-second TV ad depicting a boy using a Genie's wishes to turn his friends into a dog and a fire hydrant. Disney stipulated that Sega treat Aladdin as a top-tier title, committing to a million-copy U.S. distribution and ensuring it did not compete with Sonic Spinball (1993) during the holiday season. Katzenberg had final approval on all marketing materials. Disney's Aladdin was released for the Sega Genesis in North America on October 19, 1993, and in Europe on October 22, 1993.

=== Ports ===
The Game Boy version, which is compatible with the Super Game Boy, was released in Europe by Virgin Interactive Entertainment in September 1994 and in North America by THQ in October 1995. The Amiga version was programmed in-house at Virgin Interactive Entertainment by John Twiddy and released in Europe in January 1995. Because the Genesis and Amiga share the same microprocessor, some routines were reused from the Genesis version. Development of the PC version was slightly prolonged due to the incompatibility of Motorola machine language with Intel microprocessors. A version for the Nintendo Entertainment System was developed by NMS Software and released in Europe in 1994. The Game Boy Color port was developed by Crawfish Interactive and published by Ubi Soft in North America on November 15, 2000. A digital version of Aladdin was released on GOG.com on August 4, 2016 and removed in 2019.

=== Disney Classic Games: Aladdin and The Lion King ===
In August 2019, reports indicated that the Sega Genesis versions of Disney's Aladdin and The Lion King would appear in a collection for Nintendo Switch, PlayStation 4, and Xbox One, with a physical retail edition planned. The collection was officially confirmed shortly afterward under the title Disney Classic Games: Aladdin and The Lion King, scheduled for release in physical and digital formats on October 29, 2019.

The compilation, developed by Digital Eclipse and published by Nighthawk Interactive, includes the Genesis version of Aladdin and its Game Boy port, as well as a trade show demonstration build. Modern enhancements featured in the collection's emulation include upscaled 1080p graphics (with optional original visuals), filters and other visual effects, customizable controls, an in-game rewind function, an interactive Game Viewer allowing players to watch pre-recorded gameplay and join at any point, a save feature, an explorable museum containing development assets and interviews, an art gallery, and a music player.

The collection includes a newly revised "Final Cut" edition of the Genesis version, which was developed in consultation with members of the original development team, including animator Mike Dietz and designer William Anderson. It introduces new level sections (such as expanded rooftop areas in the opening stage), revised boss patterns and enemy behaviors, improved collision detection, graphical effects, and additional secrets, while preserving the core experience. These modifications aimed to implement refinements the original developers might have pursued with additional time, rather than constituting a full remake.

Special editions were announced in October 2019, including Retro Editions for Nintendo Switch with classic-style packaging, posters, and manuals, released on December 10, 2019. Limited-edition playable Genesis Aladdin cartridges were also produced by iam8bit in a run of 4,500 units with restored artwork and variants featuring translucent or glow-in-the-dark casings. In September 2021, an expanded collection was announced for release on November 9, 2021, on Nintendo Switch, PlayStation 4, Xbox One, and PC. This updated version incorporates all content from the 2019 release, adds the previously omitted SNES Aladdin game developed by Capcom, and includes multiple versions of The Jungle Book. Owners of the original 2019 collection can access the new material via a downloadable content upgrade.

== Reception ==
=== Genesis ===
Reception (Genesis)

Review scores
Publication	Score
AllGame	4.5/5
Computer and Video Games	80%
Dragon	5/5
Edge	8/10
Electronic Gaming Monthly	9/10, 8/10, 9/10, 8/10
Famitsu	9/10, 9/10, 9/10, 8/10
Game Informer	9.25/10
GameFan	99%, 97%, 95%, 95%
GamesMaster	95%
IGN	8/10
Jeuxvideo.com	18/20
Mean Machines Sega	82%
Mega	94%

Disney's Aladdin was met with critical acclaim upon release. Diehard GameFan's contributors forecasted awards contention and classic status, with "Sgt. Gamer" calling it "brilliant" and for all gamers. Les Ellis of GamesMaster admitted it neared perfection, declaring his critical reputation tarnished. Edge called it the Mega Drive's "new platform king," displacing Sonic the Hedgehog. "Andromeda" of GamePro predicted that the game would make video game history, (Note: Andromeda of GamePro gave the game a score of 5/5 for graphics, 4/5 for sound, 4.5/5 for control, and 5/5 for fun factor.) and Electronic Gaming Monthly (EGM)'s Martin Alessi equated its play to Super Mario and Sonic the Hedgehog.

Critics emphasized the game's groundbreaking visuals and animation. "Skid" of Diehard GameFan described the title as the most visually impressive cartridge-based game ever produced, crediting Virgin Games for achieving superior results in a short time. Ellis called the animation the finest on the Mega Drive, surpassing even Cool Spot with its pixel-perfect smoothness in character actions like sword swinging and rope climbing. Paul Mellerick of Mega praised the Disney animators for the game's quality, and Rick Petzholdt of Game Informer described the character movements as life-like, highlighting the dust clouds that fly from under Aladdin's feet when he stops quickly. Andromeda noted the Digicel design process's role in the fluid and unprecedented animations for both Aladdin and the villains. EGM's contributors, including Alessi and Ed Semrad, called the game a "visual extravaganza" that faithfully replicated the film's slapstick elements.

The gameplay earned acclaim for its fluidity, addictiveness, and polish. Skid lauded the controls as excellent in a lengthy, well-designed platformer rivaling Gunstar Heroes. Ellis found nothing to fault in the huge, linear levels, declaring it the most playable Mega Drive title. Andy Lowe of GamesMaster appreciated the intuitive, fluid play that evoked controlling a cartoon, complete with humor and variety. Mellerick said that the game was "ooz[ing] class" and that it executed every platforming element perfectly. Petzholdt praised the realistic momentum handling, while Edge commended the total control, a balanced difficulty curve, and well-crafted stages. "Jay" and "Dee" of Dragon enjoyed the arcade-style action with lifelike movement, and Adrian Price of GamesMaster noted the engaging difficulty. However, Andy McNamara of Game Informer observed basic controls in an otherwise strong adventure, and Danyon Carpenter of EGM mentioned minor jerky scrolling. Sushi-X, also of EGM, found the controls frustrating at times.

The audio received strong praise for its film ties, with minor reservations on quality. Multiple reviewers, including those from Dragon, EGM, and Game Informer, celebrated the music and sound effects, drawn directly from the movie, as catchy and immersive. Ellis and Mellerick respectively called the sound "great" and "fabulous". Andromeda acknowledged the film's tunes adding to the movie ambiance, though said the digitized voices fell short. "The Enquirer" of Diehard GameFan deemed the music adequate amid a perfect assembly, and Edge suggested room for improvement as its sole quibble.

A minority of reviewers criticized the game for its shallow depth and excessive ease. Angus Swan of Mean Machines Sega labeled it a landmark in visuals but elementary in basic, untaxing action reminiscent of Cool Spot, completable too swiftly and with abundant lives. Lucy Hickman of the same publication echoed that stunning presentation could not compensate for standard, shallow platforming too akin to prior titles, undermining its value at full price. Amanda Tipping of Computer and Video Games conceded its enjoyable and varied gameplay, yet deemed it easy to finish and best for young children. Andromeda noted advanced players might not find sufficient challenge even on harder settings.

Retrospective assessments of the game remained highly positive. Brett Alan Weiss of AllGame highlighted the game's exceptional animation and noted its moderate length and difficulty. Levi Buchanan of IGN commended the game's ability to capture the film's charm through sprite-based 2D animation derived from original cels. He deemed it superior to the SNES version and an "excellent example" of 16-bit platformers, and he recommended that buyers acquire the game via secondhand markets due to licensing constraints preventing its release on the Virtual Console. Pargonis of Jeuxvideo.com called it an entertaining platformer and praised the game's graphics, gameplay accessibility, replayability, and audio fidelity.

=== Amiga ===
Reception (Amiga)

Review scores
Publication	Score
Amiga Computing	85%
Amiga Format	90%
Amiga Power	86%
Commodore User	90%
Computer and Video Games	78%
Génération 4	90%
Joystick	80%

The Amiga version was received positively. Reviewers consistently praised the graphics for their fidelity to the film. Steve Bradley of Amiga Format called it "probably the prettiest Amiga game ever," describing the visuals' amusing quality as a "remarkable commodity in a computer game," while Lisa Collins of CU Amiga noted Aladdin's graceful movements, and his "billowy pantaloons" when he jumped. Jonathan Davies of Amiga Power described the animation as slick and superior to prior Amiga efforts, with humorous details like camels spitting apples and enemies getting pantsed. Tina Hackett of Amiga Computing praised the personality of the visuals, from Aladdin's idle animations to enemy reactions. Pinky of Joystick called the animation remarkably fluid, surpassing the Mega Drive counterpart's performance on Amiga 1200 hardware, and Michel Houng of Génération 4 deemed it the animation benchmark, refined even beyond titles like Flashback (1992). The sound design was praised for incorporating the film's Oscar-winning compositions, such as "A Whole New World," though Houng found the instrument digitization sloppy.

The gameplay was praised for its varied platforming action and intuitive controls, though some found the game linear and easy. Bradley appreciated the "compulsive" platforming for such touches as palm tree slides and magic flying ropes, while Davies was satisfied by the precise swordplay and bonus collection. Collins pointed out that the disappearing stones in the dungeon level were tricky and annoying. Hackett wrote that players would need to use a variety of platforming skills, from swashbuckling to precisely-timed jumps. Pinky reviewed the varied platforming mechanics in each of the game's eleven levels, including the collectables, merchant economy, action, and graceful controls. Houng detailed the rooftop traversal, carpet flights, and secret passages. However, Rik Skews of Computer and Video Games criticized the average variety and ease, deeming it unsuitable for experts but polished Christmas fare for kids, a view echoed by Davies and Hackett who saw it geared toward younger players despite difficulty options.

=== Other versions ===
Reception (Other versions)

Review scores
Publication	Score
AllGame	GBC: 2/5
Computer and Video Games	GB: 75% PC: 90% GBC: 4/5
Joystick	PC: 85%
Nintendo Power	GBC: 6.8/10
PC Zone	PC: 70%

The PC version was also met positively by reviewers, who praised its animation, polish, and overall quality while noting minor technical and design limitations. Computer and Video Games described it as a high-quality platformer succeeding The Lion King, with exceptional graphics and flawless gameplay, though potentially too straightforward for more experienced players. Pinky of Joystick lauded the animation for its fluidity, grace, and abundance of sequences, rivaling the film itself. However, he wrote that the scrolling stuttered even on an i486 processor, and the backgrounds suffered from dithering due to a limited color palette. Despite these performance issues, Pinky still predicted strong commercial success for the game. Jeremy Wells of PC Zone, unfamiliar with the film, compared the game favorably to The Lion King, noting its glossy presentation, detailed Disney-style sprites, and expressive character animations. His criticisms were limited to occasional misleading perspectives in the platforming, low difficulty suitable primarily for younger players, and a lack of surprises inherent to the platform genre.

Reception to the handheld versions was mixed, with praise for their content fidelity being overshadowed by their technical shortcomings. Rik Skews of Computer and Video Games, reviewing the Game Boy version, commended its competent graphics and level variety but noted the loss of the original 16-bit versions' visual impact, describing it as unremarkable standard platform gameplay that paled against competitors like Cool Spot. For the Game Boy Color version, Lee Skittrell, also of Computer and Video Games, offered high praise, calling it the finest of the 16-bit Disney platformers. He highlighted the adaptation's faithful recreation of levels (including the rapid lava chase), large and varied challenges, adherence to the film's plot, collectibles, charming Disney elements, appealing graphics, and movie-inspired music. Minor drawbacks included occasional slowdown and jerky motion during intense sequences, though its increased difficulty rendered it highly addictive. In contrast, Nintendo Power dismissed the Game Boy Color edition as a lackluster update of the Game Boy game, criticizing its hesitant controls and failure to deliver an innovative experience despite its colorful Disney basis. Jon Thompson of AllGame similarly faulted the Game Boy Color version for diminished visual appeal compared to the 1993 Sega Genesis original. He acknowledged its consistent old-school platform mechanics, but he criticized the pared-down graphics, choppy animation, twitching visuals, and frequent disappearances, which rendered it subpar despite the system's capacity for superior platformers.

=== Sales and accolades ===
Sega initially shipped 1.6 million Aladdin units worldwide in its first week, including 800,000 in the United States and another 800,000 to Europe; half of the European shipments were hardware bundles. The same month, it topped Babbage's Sega Genesis sales chart in the United States. The game went on to sell four million copies worldwide.

The game was awarded Best Genesis Game of 1993 by Electronic Gaming Monthly. They also awarded it Best Animation. GamePro named Aladdin as the best Genesis game of 1993. Mega placed the game at #12 in their Top Mega Drive Games of All Time. In 1995, Flux magazine rated the game 13th on their Top 100 Video Games. They praised the animation, detail, and gameplay, saying that "Disney's Aladdin for the Genesis [is] one of the best action/platform games in history." In the same year, MegaZone included the game in their Top 50 Games in History, summarizing: "The animation in this platformer is simply astounding and looks more like a cartoon than a video game. Some superb humorous touches too." In 2009, GamesRadar ranked the game fourth on their list of the seven best Disney games, comparing it to the SNES game: "While the SNES Aladdin fell back upon faux 3D shading and single pixel button-eyes, the Genesis version looked infinitely more fluid and expressive." In 2017, GamesRadar ranked the game 18th on its "Best Sega Genesis/Mega Drive games of all time" and praised the game's graphics and sound, saying that it captures the look and music from the film.

== Legacy ==
Nintendo, seeking to counter Aladdin's visual prowess on the competing Sega Genesis, commissioned Rare to develop Donkey Kong Country (1994) for the Super Nintendo Entertainment System, employing pre-rendered 3D animation techniques to achieve comparable or superior graphics on 16-bit hardware. The game reestablished Donkey Kong as a popular video game franchise and is considered one of the best video games of all time.

In a "Devs Play" session with Double Fine in 2014, Louis Castle, co-founder of Westwood Studios who later worked on The Lion King, revealed that the studio had pitched a second Aladdin game that would have featured pre-rendered 3D sprites, around the same time as the Amiga game Stardust and a year prior to their use in Donkey Kong Country, but the project was scrapped by Disney.
