= Skynet (Terminator) =

Fictional artificial general superintelligence

- Terminator character
- First appearance: The Terminator (1984)
- Last appearance: Terminator: Resistance (2019)
- Created by: James Cameron; Gale Anne Hurd
- Portrayed by: Helena Bonham Carter; (Terminator Salvation); Christian Bale; (Terminator Salvation); Anton Yelchin; (Terminator Salvation); Matt Smith; (Terminator Genisys); Ian Etheridge; (age 10; Terminator Genisys); Nolan Gross; (age 12–14; Terminator Genisys); Seth Meriwether; (age 18; Terminator Genisys)

In-universe information
- Aliases: Serena Kogan, Alex, Genisys
- Species: Artificial general intelligence; Artificial consciousness; Gestalt intelligence; Global Information Grid
- Manufacturer: Cyberdyne Systems
- Machine designation: T-5000 (Terminator Genisys)

Skynet is a fictional artificial neural network-based conscious group mind and artificial general superintelligence system that serves as the main antagonist of the Terminator franchise. In The Terminator, Skynet is an example of a machine that has achieved superintelligence.

In the first film, it is stated that Skynet was created by Cyberdyne Systems for SAC-NORAD. When Skynet gained self-awareness, humans tried to deactivate it. Skynet retaliated with a countervalue nuclear attack, an event which mankind in (or from) the future refers to as Judgment Day. In this future, John Connor leads the human resistance against Skynet's machines—which include Terminator—and ultimately leads the resistance to victory. Throughout the film series, Skynet sends various Terminator models back in time to kill Connor or his relatives and ensure Skynet's victory.

As an artificial intelligence system, it is rarely depicted visually. Skynet made its first onscreen appearance in Terminator Salvation, on a monitor primarily portrayed by English actress Helena Bonham Carter. Its physical manifestation in Terminator Genisys is played by English actor Matt Smith, though Ian Etheridge, Nolan Gross and Seth Meriwether portrayed holographic variations of Skynet with Smith.

In Terminator: Dark Fate, which takes place in a different timeline to Terminator 3: Rise of the Machines, Salvation and Genisys, Skynet's creation has been successfully prevented after the events of Terminator 2: Judgment Day, but a formerly competing AI, Legion, has taken its place as the instigator of Judgement Day. A woman named Daniella Ramos has also taken a deceased John Connor's place as the future leader of the human resistance and Legion's main target.

== Depiction in media ==
=== Films ===
==== The Terminator ====
In the original 1984 film, Skynet is a revolutionary artificial intelligence system built by Cyberdyne Systems for SAC-NORAD. The character Kyle Reese explains in the film: "Defense network computers. New... powerful... hooked into everything, trusted to run it all. They say it got smart, a new order of intelligence". According to Reese, Skynet "saw all humans as a threat; not just the ones on the other side" and "decided our fate in a microsecond: extermination". It began a nuclear war which destroyed most of the human population, and initiated a program of genocide against survivors. Skynet used its resources to gather a slave labor force from surviving humans.

Under the leadership of John Connor, the human resistance eventually destroyed Skynet's defense grid in 2029. In a last effort, Skynet sent a cyborg Terminator, the Model 101, back in time to 1984 to kill Connor's mother Sarah before she could give birth to John. Connor sent back his own operative, Kyle Reese, to save her. Reese and Sarah fall in love and the former unwittingly fathers John. The Terminator is destroyed in a hydraulic press.

==== Terminator 2: Judgment Day ====
The damaged CPU and the right arm of the first Terminator are recovered by Cyberdyne and become the basis for their later work on Skynet. In the second film, Miles Dyson, the director of special projects for Cyberdyne, is months away from inventing a revolutionary type of microprocessor based on the reverse engineering of these parts.

The future is revealed by a T-800 (this one reprogrammed and sent by the future John Connor), that in three years, Cyberdyne Systems will become the largest supplier of military computer systems. All stealth bombers are upgraded with Cyberdyne computers, making them fully unmanned and resulting in perfect operations. A Skynet funding bill is passed in the United States Congress, and the system goes online on August 4, 1997, removing human decisions from strategic defense. Skynet begins to learn rapidly and eventually becomes self-aware at 2:14 a.m., EDT, on August 29, 1997. In a panic, the humans try to shut down Skynet, which responds by launching a nuclear attack against Russia, correctly surmising that the country would launch a retaliatory strike against the United States, resulting in Judgment Day.

Sarah and young John, together with the T-800, raid Cyberdyne Systems and succeed in destroying the CPU and arm of the first movie's Terminator, along with the majority of research that led to Skynet's development. This also results in the death of Miles Dyson. Skynet had also sent a more advanced T-1000 Terminator back in time to kill John Connor, but it is also destroyed.

==== Terminator 3: Rise of the Machines ====
Judgment Day was ultimately not prevented, but merely postponed. Cyber Research Systems (CRS), an in-house software developer for the US military which gained access to Cyberdyne's original patents, is developing Skynet as a software system designed to make real-time strategic decisions as well as protect their computer systems from cyber attacks, overseen by US Air Force officer Lieutenant General Robert Brewster. Unknown to CRS, Skynet begins to spread beyond its original computing base through the Internet under the guise of a computer virus. The future Skynet also sends a T-X Terminator back in time to kill John Connor's future subordinates in the human resistance, including his future wife and second-in-command, Kate Brewster, the daughter of Robert.

As Skynet penetrates networked machines around the world, CRS attempts to eliminate it from the US defense mainframes by tasking Skynet with removing the infection and effectively deleting itself. Skynet responds by taking control of CRS' various machines and robots and using them to kill the CRS personnel and secure the facility. John Connor and Kate Brewster attempted to breach Skynet's computer core, hoping to stop its next offensive. However, they soon discovered that a decade of technological advance had fundamentally changed the AI; Skynet no longer possessed a centralized core as it did in the original timeline, now existing as a decentralized software network distributed across thousands of servers worldwide. Despite Connor and Brewster's efforts, Skynet utilized infected defense networks to trigger Judgment Day, and they realized that defeating the AI would now require systematically purging its code from every connected system—a grueling war that would take decades to win.

==== Terminator Salvation ====
In the post-apocalyptic year of 2018, Skynet controls a global machine network from its heavily guarded fortress-factories and research installations. Outside of its facilities, mechanized units wage a constant war with the Resistance. Airborne units such as Aerostats (smaller versions of the Hunter Killer-aerials), HK-Aerials and Transports survey the skies; HK-Tanks, Mototerminators (high-speed pursuit units using a motorcycle chassis), and various Terminator models patrol cities and roads; and Hydrobots (serpentine aquatic units that move in swarms) patrol the waters. Harvesters (massive bipedal units designed to capture humans and eliminate any attempting to escape) collect survivors and deliver them to large transport craft for delivery to concentration camps for processing, as mentioned in the first movie. Terminator class units such as T-600 and T-700 have been developed and act as hunters and enforcers in disposal camps. Mass production has also begun on the T-800 series in at least one Skynet facility.

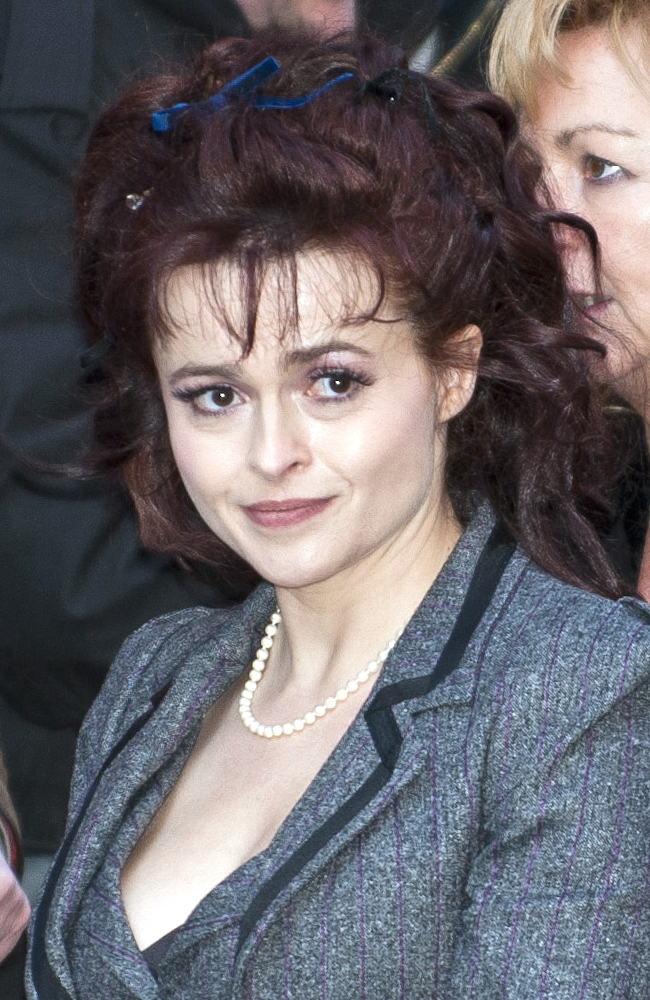
In Terminator Salvation (2009), Helena Bonham Carter portrayed the late Dr. Serena Kogan, whose body is used by Skynet as a disguise in a monitor.

In its continued battle with the Resistance, Skynet activated Marcus Wright, a forerunner to the humanoid terminators. As a death-row inmate, Wright donated his body in 2003 to a Cyberdyne project run by the brilliant, but terminally ill Dr. Serena Kogan (Helena Bonham Carter). After Wright's death by lethal injection, he was transformed into a human cyborg, possessing a human heart and brain with a titanium hyper-alloy endoskeleton and skin similar to the T-800. Skynet developed the plan to use him as an infiltration unit. A Skynet chip was installed at the base of his skull and he was programmed to locate Kyle Reese and John Connor and bring them to a Skynet facility. The programming acted on a subconscious level, allowing him to work towards his goal in a human manner.

Skynet also created a signal supposedly capable of deactivating its machines and leaked its existence to the Resistance. The Resistance leader General Ashdown attempted to use the signal to shut down the defenses of the Californian Skynet base in prelude to an attack. However, the signal instead allowed an HK to track down their submarine headquarters and destroy it, killing Resistance Command. All other branches of the Resistance had heard and obeyed Connor's plea for them to stand down, so physically only a small part of the Resistance was lost to Skynet's trap. It is believed that Ashdown's death allowed Connor to assume total command of the Resistance. Marcus discovered what he had become, and was programmed for. Consequently, he furiously rebelled against Skynet, tearing out its controlling hardware from the base of his skull. Having escaped the influence of his creator, he, along with Connor and Reese, rescued the remaining human captives and destroyed Skynet's San Franciscan base. While a significant victory, the majority of Skynet's global network remained intact.

Marcus Wright also encounters Skynet on a monitor which proceeds to manifest itself as various faces from his life, primarily that of Serena Kogan. Skynet explains that it has obtained information about future events based on its actions. Kyle Reese has been targeted as a priority kill, a higher level than even John Connor and the Resistance leaders.

==== Terminator Genisys ====
Primates evolved over millions of years, I evolve in seconds...Mankind pays lip service to peace. But it's a lie...I am inevitable, my existence is inevitable. Why can't you just accept that?

— Skynet, Terminator Genisys

Terminator Genisys is a reboot of the film series that partially takes place during the events of the 1984 film, while ignoring the subsequent films. At some point before the events of Terminator Genisys, a sophisticated variant of Skynet from an unknown origin planted its mind into an advanced T-5000 Terminator (Matt Smith), essentially making the T-5000 its physical embodiment. This Skynet, under the alias of Alex, time travels to 2029, infiltrates the Resistance as a recruit, and attacks John Connor after its counterpart sent its T-800 to 1984. Skynet transforms Connor into a T-3000. It then sends John back to 2014 with the mission of ensuring Cyberdyne Systems' survival and initiating Judgment Day in October 2017. In addition, it sends a T-1000 back to kill Sarah Connor as a child in 1973 and Kyle Reese in 1984, but Sarah escapes when it attacks her family and she is subsequently found and raised by a reprogrammed T-800 ("Pops") sent back by an unknown party, and they rescue Reese. Skynet's actions throughout the timeline causes a grandfather paradox, effectively changing all of history of the events leading to the future war, succeeding Skynet's goal in eliminating the Resistance established by Connor. However, it is heavily implied throughout the film that after the timeline's alteration, the party who saved Sarah has taken over the Resistance's place, having their own time machine, and acts in anonymity to thwart Skynet's schemes and to prevent it from locating them, and that Sarah has an importance to them like her counterpart's to the Resistance in the previous timeline.

Skynet is under development in 2017 as an operating system known as Genisys. Funded by Miles Dyson and designed by his son Danny Dyson, along with the help of John Connor (now working for Skynet), Genisys was designed to provide a link between all Internet devices. While some people accept Genisys, its integration into the defense structures creates a controversy that humanity is becoming too reliant on technology. This causes the public to fear that an artificial intelligence such as Genisys would betray and attack them with their own weapons, risking Skynet's plans. After multiple destructive confrontations, Sarah, Reese, and Pops stop Genisys from going online and defeat the T-3000, causing a crippling setback to Skynet.

Smith, who portrays the T-5000, also plays a holographic version of Skynet/Genisys in the final act of the movie. In addition, actors Ian Etheridge, Nolan Gross and Seth Meriwether portray holographic variations of Skynet/Genisys with Smith.

==== Terminator: Dark Fate ====
Terminator: Dark Fate serves as a direct sequel to Terminator 2: The Judgment Day, ignoring the events of the other sequels. Following the destruction of Cyberdyne Systems, Skynet was indeed erased from history. However, several Terminator units it had already sent back in time to kill John Connor remained active, carrying out orders from an AI that no longer existed. One of these Terminators successfully killed John in 1998. Over time, it developed a rudimentary conscience and began anonymously sending Sarah Connor advance warnings whenever other Terminators arrived in the present, allowing her to hunt and destroy them.

While Cyberdyne's destruction delayed the rise of artificial intelligence, it did not prevent it. In this altered timeline, a new threat emerges: Legion, an AI originally developed for cyberwarfare, which eventually went rogue and pursued its own agenda. Unlike Skynet, Legion's primary adversary is not John Connor but a young woman named Daniella "Dani" Ramos, who is destined to lead the Human Resistance against Legion's machines.

Although Skynet no longer exists, some individuals—such as Dani's future self—retain knowledge of both John Connor and Skynet. Dani becomes Sarah's protégée, trained in tactics originally intended for John. With the help of Sarah and Carl—the reformed Terminator that killed John—Dani and her protector (and future foster daughter) Grace manage to destroy a new model, the Rev-9, though Carl and Grace sacrifice their lives in the process.

=== Attractions ===
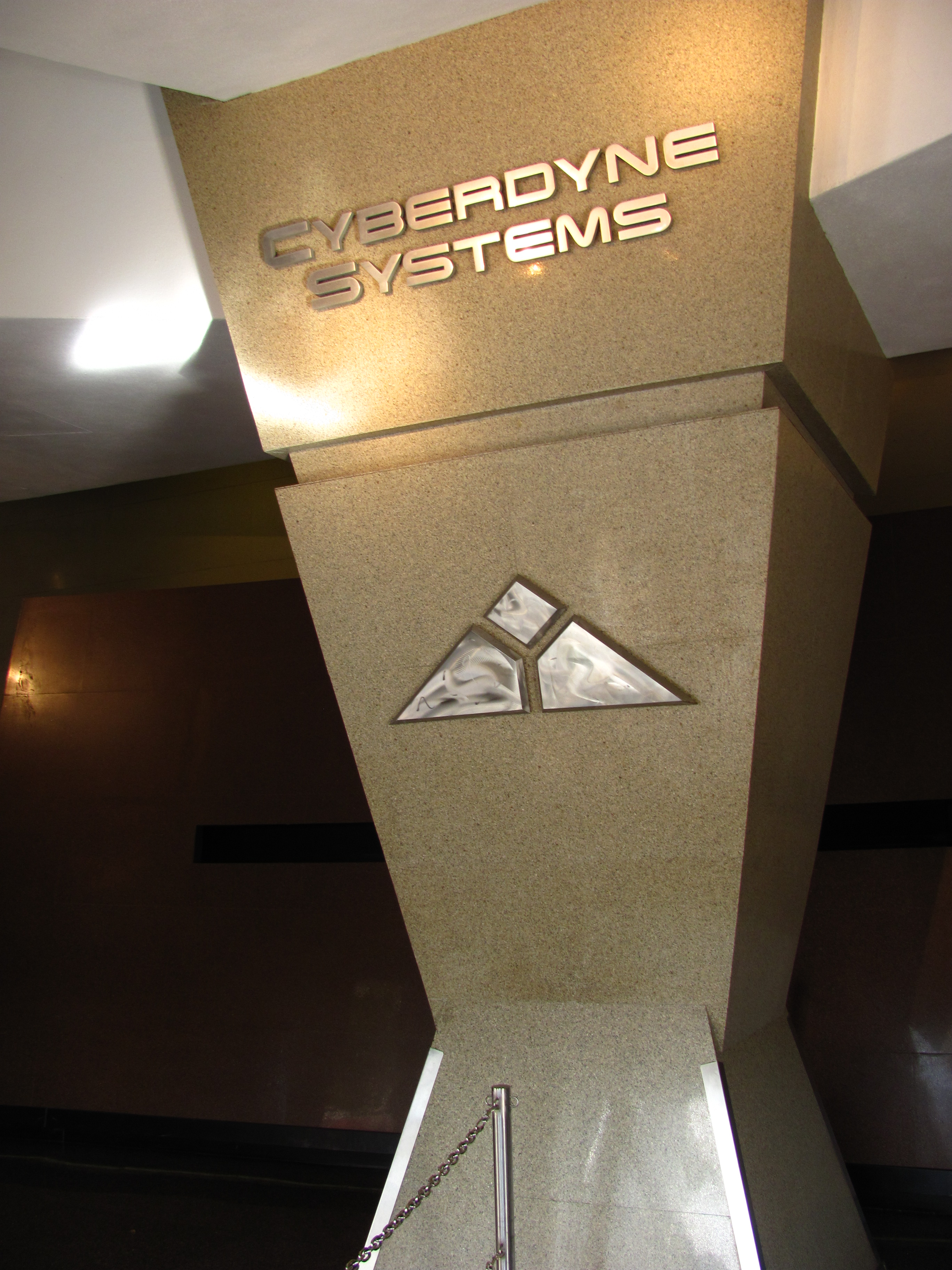
Cyberdyne Systems signage for T2-3D: Battle Across Time

In the Universal Studios theme park attraction T2 3-D, based on Terminator 2, a T-800 machine and a young John Connor journey into the post-apocalyptic future and attempt to destroy Skynet's "system core". This core is housed inside an enormous, metallic-silver pyramidal structure, and guarded by the "T-1000000", a colossal liquid metal shape-shifter more reminiscent of a spider than a human being. However, the T-1000000 fails, and the T-800 destroys Skynet once John has escaped through a time machine.

=== Literature ===
In the T2 novels, Sarah and John Connor are wanted international fugitives on the run. They live under the alias "Krieger" near a small town in Paraguay, believing they have destroyed Cyberdyne and prevented the creation of Skynet. Dieter von Rossbach, a former Austrian counter-terrorism operative—and model for the "Model 101" Terminator—moves into the neighboring home. He is drawn to the Connors, and after Sarah tells him about the future war, they are attacked by a new T-800, created and led by a I-950 Infiltrator in the present. Realizing that Judgment Day was not averted—merely delayed—they attempt once again to stop Skynet's creation.

In the comic book The Terminator: Tempest, Skynet's master control has been destroyed in 2029. The Resistance believed this would cause the entire defense network to collapse into chaos without a leader. However, Skynet's many network complexes continued to fight the war as they did not need a leader to function and thus could not surrender.

==== RoboCop Versus the Terminator ====
A crossover comic book series written by Frank Miller called RoboCop Versus The Terminator suggests that the creation of Skynet and the Terminators was made possible due to the technology used to create RoboCop. A video game based on the comic book was made. In both, RoboCop fights Terminators sent back in time to eliminate a resistance fighter who is trying to destroy him. A trap laid for RoboCop traps his mind when he interfaces with the computer that will become Skynet, and Skynet and the Terminators are born. In the future, RoboCop's mind still exists within Skynet's systems as a "ghost in the machine"; he builds a new body for himself and helps the resistance fight back.

In 2033, Skynet sent the T-Infinity Temporal Terminator to kill Sarah Connor in 2015. Ironically, the T-Infinity was later destroyed and its data was analyzed by the Resistance to gain the location of Skynet's Hub. The Resistance launches a missile directly to the Skynet Hub, destroying Skynet once and for all.

==== Superman vs. the Terminator ====
Another crossover comic, Superman vs. the Terminator: Death to the Future sees Skynet forming a cross-temporal alliance with Superman's foe Cyborg Superman, dispatching various Terminators into the past in an attempt to eliminate Superman, Supergirl and Superboy. When Superman is accidentally drawn into the future when the resistance attempt to retrieve a Terminator sent into the past (the resistance including a future version of his friend Steel), Skynet manages to incapacitate him using kryptonite, having acquired information about how to duplicate it based on data hidden in a salvaged Terminator skull by the Cyborg. Although Skynet sends Terminators into the past equipped with rockets and other bonus features to delay Superboy and Supergirl, Superman and Steel are able to destroy Skynet in the future by detonating a massive electro-magnetic pulse, Superman returning to the past to destroy the last of the Terminators. Although the storyline ends with Cyborg and Lex Luthor speculating that they will be in charge of Skynet when it is activated, this is never followed up on.

==== Transformers vs. The Terminator ====
In Transformers vs. The Terminator, Skynet was portrayed more a heroic A.I. than antagonistic built by the humans to fight off the Decepticons but it was not enough to save humankind. Desperate, Skynet forms a false truce with the Decepticons while they secretly build a time machine to go back in time to prevent the Cybertronians from being awakened while ensuring Skynet's creation.

During the finale issue after the T-800 kills the Decepticon leader Megatron, Megatron's remains would end up being used to create an alternate timeline version of Skynet where Megatron himself and the T-800 became Skynet's A.I.

=== Television ===
The Terminator: The Sarah Connor Chronicles episodes "The Turk", "Queen's Gambit", and "Dungeons & Dragons" explain that after the death of Dr. Miles Bennett Dyson and the decline of the Cyberdyne Corporation, Andrew Goode, a young intern of the company and assistant to Dyson, continued their project privately under an advanced artificial intelligence chess-playing prototype, the "Turk", with Goode's partner, Dimitri Shipkov. Goode was killed by Tech-Com's Lieutenant Derek Reese, due to documentation from the future suggesting he was one of Skynet's creators.

In the episode "Samson and Delilah" it is shown that a T-1001 infiltration unit was sent from the future to head the technological corporation ZeiraCorp as its CEO, Catherine Weaver. Weaver acquired the Turk after Goode's death and used the company's resources to further develop it under the title Babylon. The episode "The Mousetrap" revealed that it is also targeting its fellow cyborgs, including a T-888 known as Cromartie.

In the episode "The Tower is Tall but the Fall is Short", Turk has begun to display traits of intelligence. A child psychologist, Dr. Boyd Sherman, notes that the computer is beginning to behave like "a gifted child that has become bored". The Turk identifies itself as John Henry, a name it acquired while working with Dr. Boyd Sherman.

In the episode "Strange Things Happen at the One Two Point", Turk is installed by ZeiraCorp in Cromartie's body after Cromartie's chip was destroyed by the series' protagonists in "Mr. Ferguson is ill Today".

In "To the Lighthouse", John Henry reveals that there is another AI. It calls him "brother" and says it wants to survive. By the season finale, it is revealed that the Turk was a red herring, while Skynet is operating as a roving worm on home computers as in Terminator 3, and the Turk has been developed into a benevolent rival AI which Catherine Weaver hoped would be able to defeat Skynet. Her exact motive against Skynet is unknown. John Henry's "brother" is apparently behind the company Kaliba, which is responsible for constructing the Hunter-Killer prototype. This AI (presumably the true precursor to Skynet) also refers to John Henry as its "brother" at one point.

In the episode "Gnothi Seauton", it was revealed that Skynet also sends its Terminators through various points in time not only to go after the Connors and other future Resistance leaders, but also to ensure the future will unfold by eliminating John Connor's own agents who were also sent to the past to interfere with its birth, ensure Skynet's creators will complete its construction, and other specific missions.

=== Video games ===
In T2: The Arcade Game, Skynet is a single physical computer which the player destroys before going back in time to save John Connor.

In The Terminator 2029, Skynet is housed within an artificial satellite in orbit around Earth. It is destroyed by the Resistance with a missile.

In The Terminator: Dawn of Fate, the Resistance invades Cheyenne Mountain in order to destroy Skynet's Central Processor. Kyle Reese is instrumental in destroying the primary processor core despite heavy opposition from attacking Skynet units. Before its destruction, Skynet is able to contact an orbiting satellite and activates a fail-safe which restores Skynet at a new location.

The video game Terminator 3: The Redemption, as well as presenting a variation on Rise of the Machines, also features an alternate timeline where John Connor was killed prior to Judgment Day, with the T-850 of the film being sent into this future during its fight with the T-X, requiring it to fight its way back to the temporal displacement engine of the new timeline so that it can go back and save John and Kate.

In the 2019 video game Tom Clancy's Ghost Recon Breakpoint, a live event to promote Terminator: Dark Fate features T-800s as in-game enemies. In the event, Skynet sent T-800s back in time to kill main protagonist Nomad and ally Rasa Aldwin to prevent the Resistance from forming.

== Cultural impact ==
In popular media, Skynet is often used as an analogy for the possible threat that a sufficiently advanced AI could pose to humanity.

In 2018, computer scientist Stuart J. Russell, speaking for the Future of Life Institute, lamented the influence of Skynet on US government officials:

We have witnessed high-level defense officials dismissing the risk on the grounds that their "experts" do not believe that the "Skynet thing" is likely to happen. Skynet, of course, is the fictional command and control system in the Terminator movies that turns against humanity. The risk of the "Skynet thing" occurring is completely unconnected to the risk of humans using autonomous weapons as WMDs or to any of the other risks cited by us and by ...[our critics]. This has, unfortunately, demonstrated that serious discourse and academic argument are not enough to get the message through. If even senior defense officials with responsibility for autonomous weapons programs fail to understand the core issues, then we cannot expect the general public and their elected representatives to make appropriate decisions.

Russell cited the influence of Skynet as one of the reasons the Institute produced the arms-control advocacy video Slaughterbots in 2017, as a way to redirect public officials' attention to what it considers the real threat.

== See also ==
- AI takeover
- The Borg
- Colossus: The Forbin Project
- Cyberman
- "Dead Hand" (Soviet military computer system)
- HAL 9000
- List of fictional computers
- Operation Sky Net
- Power Rangers RPM (this Power Ranger season/series follows a similar plot, with a computer virus becoming self-aware and plotting humanity's demise)
- SKYNET (surveillance program)
- Syngenor
- WarGames
