= Global Gladiators =

1992 video game

- North American cover art
- Developer: Virgin Games (Note: Assistance on graphics for Master System by Graftgold.)
- Publisher: Virgin Games
- Producer: David Luehmann
- Designer: David Bishop
- Programmer: David Perry
- Artists: Mike Dietz; Christian Laursen
- Composer: Tommy Tallarico
- Platforms: Sega Genesis, Master System, Game Gear, Amiga
- Release: NA: November 1992; EU: April 1993
- Genre: Platform
- Mode: Single-player

Global Gladiators is a 1992 platform game developed by Virgin Games, originally programmed by David Perry for the Sega Genesis and eventually ported by other Virgin Games teams in Europe to the Master System, Game Gear, and Amiga. The game is based on the McDonald's fast food chain and has a strong environmentalist message. The game is a spiritual successor to the NES game M.C. Kids, another McDonald's-themed game that also featured Mick and Mack as its playable characters.

== Development and release ==
In 1992, Virgin Mastertronic, while expanding into the United States, entered a deal with McDonald's to publish a video game themed around its restaurants within six months. Virgin contacted Probe Software programmer David Perry and made a generous offer to hire him into their American development branch in Irvine, California; Virgin was convinced by Perry's work on The Terminator that he could quickly make a satisfactory game for the Sega Genesis. Virgin granted Perry an apartment overlooking Laguna Beach, which he remarked was "like living in Baywatch".

For Global Gladiators, the development team combined tools that they had developed for previous titles. The animation, background art, and music were respectively created by Mike Dietz, Christian Laursen, and Tommy Tallarico. David Bishop served as the game's designer, while the levels were designed by Bill Anderson. Aside from some branding, the game had little to do with the McDonald's franchise. This displeased visiting McDonald's executives, who questioned the lack of restaurants and Ronald McDonald. To this, Perry bluntly replied that no one liked Ronald McDonald and no one wanted restaurants in the game. Perry had planned to return to the United Kingdom upon the game's completion, but its unexpected critical success convinced him to stay in California; as he recalled, "it suddenly made people appreciate me". Global Gladiators impressed Walt Disney Computer Software producer Patrick Gilmore, which led to a relationship between Virgin and Disney that would produce such titles as Disney's Aladdin and The Jungle Book.

== Reception ==
Reception

Aggregate score
Aggregator	Score
GameRankings	GEN: 75.00%

Review scores
Publication	Score
Amiga Computing	AMI: 81%
Amiga Format	AMI: 86%
Amiga Power	AMI: 84%
Commodore User	AMI: 75%
Computer and Video Games	GEN: 90%
Electronic Gaming Monthly	GEN: 6/10, 8/10, 8/10, 8/10; GG: 7/10
GameFan	GEN: 92%, 95%
GamesMaster	GEN: 86%
Mean Machines Sega	SMS: 77%
Sega Master Force	GEN: 86%

Sega Pro magazine gave an overall score of 93/100, noting the game's challenging difficulty, praising the game's graphics—stating "brilliantly animated sprites and characters give this game a very polished feel"—and the game's sound as "very much geared to the rave style with a few rocky tunes for good measure" and concluding "[A] great game that will keep up till the wee hours, a definite purchase for all of you seeking a big challenge." Mega Action gave an overall score of 93%, describing the game as "a brilliant game with some really nice sprites".

== See also ==
- M.C. Kids
- McDonald's Treasure Land Adventure
