= Cool Spot =

1993 video game

- Developer: Virgin Games (Note: Game Boy version developed by NMS Software.)
- Publisher: Virgin Games
- Producer: Cathie A. Bartz-Todd
- Designers: David Bishop; Bill Anderson
- Programmer: David Perry
- Artists: Christian Laursen; Mike Dietz; Shawn McLean; Ed Schofield; Roger Hardy; Willis Wong
- Composers: Tommy Tallarico: Master System, Game Gear; Matt Furniss; Game Boy; Mark Cooksey; Amiga; Andrew Barnabas
- Series: Spot
- Platforms: Sega Genesis, Super NES, Master System, Amiga, Game Gear, Game Boy, MS-DOS
- Release: April 1993: Genesis; NA: April 1993; EU: June 1993 Super NES; NA: September 1993; EU: February 24, 1994 Master System; EU: October 1993 Amiga; EU: December 1, 1993 Game Gear; EU: June 19, 1994; NA: October 1993 Game Boy; EU: September 3, 1994; NA: October 1994 MS-DOS; EU: December 17, 1994
- Genre: Platform
- Mode: Single-player

Cool Spot is a 1993 platform game developed by Virgin Games for the Sega Genesis, Super Nintendo Entertainment System, Master System, Game Gear, Game Boy, Amiga, and MS-DOS. The title character is Spot, a mascot for the soft drink brand 7 Up. Spot's appearance in his own video game came at a time when other brand mascots (like Chester Cheetah and the Noid) were appearing in their own video games.

== Gameplay ==
Screenshot of the Sega Genesis version

Cool Spot is a single-player platform game in which the player controls the title character. Spot can jump and can attack by throwing soda bubbles in any direction. Spot can also cling to and climb various things by jumping up in front of them. In each level the player must rescue other cool spots, who look exactly alike, from their cages. In order to do so, the player is required to collect a certain number of "spots" that changes (usually increasing) as the game progresses. "Spots" are placed around the level in large quantities. The player's health is monitored by a humorous Spot face that gradually bends forward and eventually falls from its position as damage occurs. Damage is taken by touching enemies and their projectiles and certain other obstacles. There is also a time limit for each level. The game has no save feature but does include checkpoints in the form of flagpoles.

If the player successfully collects enough Spots to enter the Bonus Stage after defeating a level, it is possible to collect Continues by grabbing a letter hidden within the stage. All letters spell "UNCOLA" (7 Up's slogan). If a Continue letter is collected, Spot will be able to restart on the level he was on at the time of losing his last life, although his total points will be reset.

== Development ==
In an April 1993 interview with French magazine Mega Force, programmer David Perry stated that development of Cool Spot took approximately six months, comprising three months of programming, one month of testing and two months for Sega's approval process. Perry described an eight-person development team consisting of himself as programmer, Cathie Bartz-Todd as producer, Mike Dietz and Shawn McLean as animators, Christian Laursen as background artist, David Bishop and Bill Anderson as artists, and Tommy Tallarico as composer.

== Reception ==
Reception

Review scores
Publication	Score
Famitsu	SNES: 7/10, 5/10, 5/10, 5/10
GameZone	SNES: 88/100
Joypad	SNES: 93%
Nintendo Power	GB: 13/20; SNES: 15.3/20
Total!	SNES: 92%
Video Games (DE)	SNES: 81%
Mega	SMD: 93%
Pelit	82%
Sega Master Force	SMD: 91/100
Sega Pro	SMD: 93%

Pelit gave Cool Spot a score of 82%, and summarized it as "one of the most enjoyable platform games in a long time".

In 1995, Total! ranked the SNES version of the game 65th on its list of the "Top 100 SNES Games", calling it "the game that Dave Perry really showed his talents off with. Not deep, but a great laugh." In the same year, MegaZone included Cool Spot on its list of the "Top 50 Games in History", calling the game a "gorgeous platformer" and praising its animation. In 1996, GamesMaster ranked the Genesis version 92nd on its list of the "Top 100 Games of All Time". Also in 1996, Super Play ranked the SNES version 100th on its list of the "Top 100 SNES Games of All Time", praising the game's graphics and calling it "one of the few non-Mario platformers worth anything more than a passing glance." In 2018, Complex ranked the SNES version 88th on its list of the "Best Super Nintendo Games of All Time", calling the game a "pretty enjoyable platformer" despite its product placement.

The game sold one million copies.

== Legacy ==
A sequel, Spot Goes to Hollywood, was released in 1995.

== See also ==
- Spot: The Video Game
- Spot: The Cool Adventure
