= Scribblenauts =

Series of puzzle video games by 5th Cell

- Genre: Action puzzle platform
- Developers: 5th Cell; Shiver Entertainment
- Publisher: Warner Bros. Interactive Entertainment
- Creator: Jeremiah Slaczka
- Artist: Edison Yan
- Composer: David J. Franco
- Platforms: Nintendo DS; iOS; Android; Wii U; Nintendo 3DS; PlayStation 4; Xbox One; Microsoft Windows; Nintendo Switch
- First release: Scribblenauts; September 15, 2009
- Latest release: Scribblenauts Showdown; March 6, 2018

Scribblenauts is a video game series developed by 5th Cell and Shiver Entertainment and published by Warner Bros. Interactive Entertainment.

It is of the action puzzle game genre. The series is owned and published by Warner Bros. Interactive Entertainment. The first game in the series was titled Scribblenauts and was first released on September 15, 2009, in North America, exclusively on the Nintendo DS. Since the release of the first game, five other Scribblenauts games have been released, in addition to two compilations and two comic adaptations.

The Scribblenauts series primarily sees the player as Maxwell, a boy who has a magical notebook that summons anything he writes in it. Players are tasked with solving puzzles by summoning different items and creatures using the notebook, leading to emergent gameplay elements. The sixth and latest installment in the series, Scribblenauts Showdown, has significantly different gameplay than other entries, with it being more of a party game, rather than an action puzzle game.

Critical reception of the series has been generally positive, with critics praising how the series encourages creative thinking and the number of objects that can be summoned within the games. Some criticism has, however, been directed towards the lack of properties of objects, which some critics have felt restricted the player's creativity. By October 2015, the series had sold over 13 million copies across its different installments.

== Games ==
Release timeline
2009	Scribblenauts
2010	Super Scribblenauts
2011	Scribblenauts Remix
2012	Scribblenauts Unlimited
2013	Scribblenauts Collection; Scribblenauts Unmasked: A DC Comics Adventure
2014
2015
2016
2017
2018	Scribblenauts Showdown; Scribblenauts Mega Pack

The first Scribblenauts game, also titled Scribblenauts, was unveiled in December 2008, when its gameplay was first shown. Scribblenauts was later available as a playable demo at E3 2009, where its presence received numerous awards and honors. Scribblenauts was released in September 2009 in North America, exclusively for the Nintendo DS. Five other games in the Scribblenauts series have been released for multiple different platforms. Additionally, two compilation games have also been released: Scribblenauts Collection (2013) for the Nintendo DS, consisting of the first and second game, and Scribblenauts Mega Pack (2018) for the Nintendo Switch, PlayStation 4, and Xbox One, consisting of the 4th and 5th games. The series also has two canceled games, first being Scribblenauts: Fighting Words, which began development in 2014 and was canceled in March 2016 after the lay off of forty-five 5th Cell employees. In late 2019, a cancelled 3D action game trailer was leaked on Instagram by former developers.

=== List ===
1. Scribblenauts, the first game in the series, was released on the Nintendo DS on September 15, 2009, with a Europe release following on October 9.
2. Super Scribblenauts was released for the Nintendo DS on October 12, 2010, in North America, after it was first announced in an issue of Nintendo Power earlier that same year.
3. Scribblenauts Remix was released for iOS devices on October 11, 2011. The game was later ported to Android systems on December 10, 2012.
4. Scribblenauts Unlimited was released on November 18, 2012, for the Wii U, with a PC port via the Steam service releasing later the same month. The game was later released on the Nintendo 3DS on December 6 the same year, and on mobile devices in December 2015.
5. Scribblenauts Unmasked: A DC Comics Adventure was released on September 24, 2013, for Wii U, Nintendo 3DS, and PCs via the Steam service.
6. Scribblenauts Showdown, the latest entry in the series, was released on March 6, 2018, for the Nintendo Switch, PlayStation 4, and Xbox One.

== Gameplay and common elements ==
A screenshot of Scribblenauts Unlimited, showing Maxwell having summoned a ladder to rescue a cat from a tree

Scribblenauts is a series of emergent puzzle games, where players primarily take control of a young boy named Maxwell, who has a magical notebook that summons anything he writes in it. Players are tasked with solving puzzles by summoning different objects with the notebook, which rewards the player with "Starites", a type of star. Puzzles in Scribblenauts typically have multiple different solutions, with players being encouraged to use out-of-the-box ideas. The original three games were divided into linear levels, whereas Scribblenauts Unlimited and Unmasked took a more open world-like approach, with individual levels featuring multiple different puzzles for the player to solve.

Summoning objects is done via a keyboard interface or a rotary wheel, where players type the object they wish to summon. Starting in Super Scribblenauts, players could also add adjectives to words to alter their appearance and properties. The games recognizes thousands of words, although it omits most profane words, gore, and copyrighted material. The games have, however, included some copyrighted characters, such as Nintendo's Mario and Link, among other characters, in the Wii U release of Scribblenauts Unlimited.

Scribblenauts Showdown features drastically different gameplay than other installments in the series, with it being a party game where players play different minigames. Before starting a minigame players must choose an object to use, the first letter of which is predetermined by a carnival wheel.

== Development ==
The first Scribblenauts game was first conceived by 5th Cell in spring 2007, around the same time as they had come up with their other title, Lock's Quest. The first idea for Scribblenauts named "Once Upon a Time" was inspired by Mad Libs; in it, a player could draw sentences on the bottom screen and the action would appear on the top screen. Jeremiah Slaczka said that it was a good idea but it was not a game. Later on Jeremiah had a dream where he was solving puzzles in an Aztec Temple. He merged the two ideas together and made "Scribblenauts" (a portmanteau of Scribble Astronauts). The first story for the game was about an astronaut that went to different planets to help them out.

The general concept of Scribblenauts was that "anything you write, you can use", with 5th Cell spending three months just listing different objects to be added to the game. The game was developed using an engine named "Objectnaut", which allowed 5th Cell to quickly add properties to objects and creatures. According to 5th Cell creative director Jeremiah Slaczka, Scribblenauts was developed to be more of a casual game, akin to that of Brain Age and Nintendogs.

Warner Bros. Interactive Entertainment was chosen to publish the series in English territories, due to them showing gradual interest in the first Scribblenauts game as it was developed. Konami published the first two games in Japan.

After the layoff of 45 5th Cell employees in 2016, development of the series was shifted over to Shiver Entertainment, who would proceed to develop the series' sixth entry, Scribblenauts Showdown.

== Reception ==
Aggregate review scores
Game	Metacritic
Scribblenauts	79/100
Super Scribblenauts	81/100
Scribblenauts Remix	86/100
Scribblenauts Unlimited	73/100
Scribblenauts Unmasked: A DC Comics Adventure	71/100
Scribblenauts Showdown	47/100

Reception of the Scribblenauts across its different installments has been mixed. According to review aggregator Metacritic, the first three installments of the series all received "generally favorable reviews" from critics, whereas the next three games received either "mixed" or "generally unfavorable" reviews.

The general concept of the series has been described as encouraging creativity from the player. Some reviewers have, however, felt that the player's creativity is limited by the lack of unique properties of objects. Ian Bonds of Destructoid, reviewing Scribblenauts Unmasked, wrote that the game promotes creativity, but only creativity that the game designers intended. The A.V. Club's John Teti, reviewing the original Scribblenauts game, felt that most objects are pointless, noting one scenario where a plumber with a wrench would not fix a leaking pipe.

Critics have enjoyed the series' art style, which has been described as charming and cute. Casey Malone of Paste wrote that Scribblenauts has an adorable art style, describing it as being akin to paper dolls. IGN's Chuck Osborn, reviewing Scribblenauts Unmasked, felt that the series' "cutesy art style and presentation" made it clear that the games can be enjoyed by different age demographics, opining that even DC Comics characters such as Doomsday and Mr. Zsasz, who are normally "bloodthirsty killers", become adorable when in the series' art style.

The series' soundtrack has been a source of generally positive reception and has been described as upbeat and "whimsical". In a review for Scribblenauts Unlimited, Game Informer's Kyle Hilliard complimented the music, writing that it "rests pleasantly in the background". Destructoid's Dale North criticized the music of Super Scribblenauts, writing that it felt repetitive.

Scribblenauts Showdown is generally considered the worst game in the series by critics, who felt that the game restricted the player's creativity by limiting the objects usable in a minigame. Nintendo World Report's Daan Koopman wrote that Showdown was highly underwhelming, and criticized how the different objects barely differ in gameplay. Steven Petite of Digital Trends was more positive to Showdown, writing that the game is a "fresh and fun spin on the party game genre" due to the game's object creation feature.

== Merchandise and other media ==
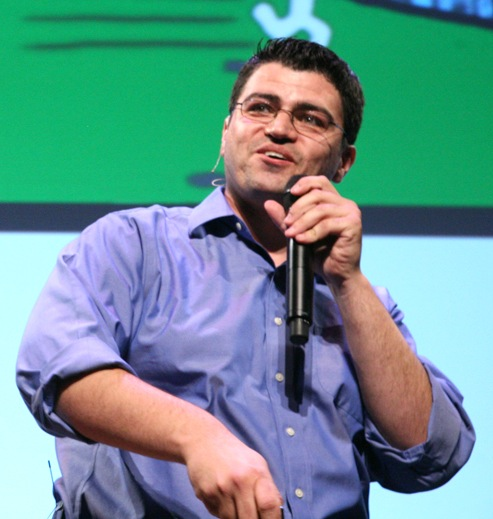
American writer Josh Elder adapted the series into comics.

Multiple pieces of merchandise featuring series protagonist Maxwell have been released, such as a real-life replica of Maxwell's "rooster hat", which came with GameStop and EB Games pre-orders of the original Scribblenauts game, and a figurine of the character released to promote the release of Super Scribblenauts. In 2011, in collaboration with Funko, 5th Cell released a vinyl figure and plush of Maxwell. In conjunction with the release of Scribblenauts Unmasked: A DC Comics Adventure, a series of Scribblenauts vinyl figurines was released by DC Collectibles.

Bundled with the Wii U release of Unmasked: A DC Comics Adventure was a one-shot comic set in the Scribblenauts universe featuring DC Comics characters written by American writer Josh Elder, titled Scribblenauts Unmasked: A Battle Most Bizarre. The one-shot was first conceived when editor Alex Antone asked Elder to pitch a comic adaptation of Scribblenauts. Following the pitch for the one-shot, Antone asked Elder to pitch him an idea for a limited comic book series also based on Scribblenauts, which ended up becoming the 9-issues long Scribblenauts Unmasked: A Crisis of Imagination. To promote the release of the original one-shot, multiple of DC Comic's other comics received alternate covers featuring the art style of Scribblenauts.

American publishing company Prima Games has released two official strategy guides for the Scribblenauts series: one of the first game and one of the second game, released in 2009 and 2010, respectively.
