= Scribblenauts Remix =

2011 video game

- App Store art
- Developers: 5th Cell; Iron Galaxy Studios
- Publisher: Warner Bros. Interactive Entertainment
- Series: Scribblenauts
- Platforms: iOS, Android
- Release: iOS: WW: October 11, 2011; Android: WW: December 10, 2012
- Genres: Emergent, puzzle, action
- Mode: Single-player

Scribblenauts Remix is an emergent action puzzle video game developed by 5th Cell and Iron Galaxy Studios and published by Warner Bros. Interactive Entertainment. It was released on iOS on October 12, 2011, and Android on December 10, 2012. The game provides forty levels from both Scribblenauts and its sequel, Super Scribblenauts along with ten new levels for iOS and Android. The mechanics of the game are based on Super Scribblenauts, allowing for the use of adjectives in addition to nouns. The game uses built-in features of iOS, such as the touch keyboard, and was released simultaneously with iOS version 5, incorporating new features such as cloud storage via iCloud to play the game across multiple devices. The game also features Game Center integration.

As a result of a price drop to approximately one dollar, Scribblenauts Remix took the top sales spot for iOS games during the week of November 14, 2011, knocking long-term favorite Angry Birds from this spot. By February 2012, it had gained more than one million downloads, and in honor of that it was updated with a Valentine's playground.

== Development ==
Scribblenauts Remix was first leaked in August 2011 when it was discovered that Warner Bros. had registered a website domain titled ScribblenautsRemix.com before the game had been officially announced. Nothing was gathered from the leak, however, except for the title of the game, with many fans and media outlets speculating if it was supposed to be a new game or if the name Remix suggested it would be a collection of the previous two.

Scribblenauts Remix was surprise announced two months later on October 11, 2011 and was revealed to be a mobile game for iOS devices, becoming available for the iPhone 3GS, iPhone 4, iPhone 4S, and iPod third and fourth generations later the same day for $4.99. Scribblenauts Remix was co-developed by Iron Galaxy Studios and 5th Cell while they were developing their Xbox Live Arcade game Hybrid. The game was built on the code and mechanics of Super Scribblenauts, as the team considered it superior to the original and felt it had improved upon its formula. However, several levels from Scribblenauts were also included and updated to support adjectives, as well as a selection of brand new ones.

=== Updates ===
Throughout 2012, various seasonal updates were released to coincide with holidays such as Easter and Christmas. The first of these updates, released in February, celebrated both Valentine's Day and the milestone of one million downloads on the App Store. It included a free Valentine's Day-themed background for the sandbox mode and updated the app icon with pink hearts to match the holiday. Additional holiday updates were released throughout the year celebrating Easter, the back-to-school season, Halloween, Thanksgiving and Christmas. Alongside the free background, the Christmas update allowed players to gift the full game to a friend for free for a limited time.

In June 2012, version 2.0 was released, introducing the World Pass, a $0.99 DLC expansion that all future worlds would be locked behind. Avatars were also introduced, returning from Super Scribblenauts, with themed avatar packs being released as paid in app purchases in each holiday update. Twelve worlds were released as part of the World Pass, alongside the five included in the base game, for a total of 17 worlds and 170 levels.

== Reception ==
Reception

Aggregate score
Aggregator	Score
Metacritic	86/100 (16 reviews)
