= Super Scribblenauts =

2010 video game

- Cover art
- Developer: 5th Cell
- Publishers: WW: Warner Bros. Interactive Entertainment; JP: Konami
- Director: Jeremiah Slaczka
- Designer: Sean Wissler
- Series: Scribblenauts
- Engine: Objectnaut
- Platform: Nintendo DS
- Release: NA: October 12, 2010; AU: October 27, 2010; EU: October 29, 2010; JP: October 13, 2011
- Genres: Emergent, puzzle, action
- Modes: Single-player, online level sharing

Super Scribblenauts is an emergent action puzzle game developed by 5th Cell and published by Warner Bros. Interactive Entertainment for the Nintendo DS handheld game console. The game was released on October 12, 2010. It is the sequel to the Nintendo DS game Scribblenauts.

The object of the game is to solve puzzles by writing or typing any object which exists in the game's vocabulary in order to interact with other parts of the level. The vocabulary includes numerous adjectives that can give the object special properties that may be needed to solve a puzzle.

== Gameplay ==
Super Scribblenauts is a side-scrolling action-oriented puzzle game that requires players to collect magic star-shaped tokens called Starites by inputting words, such as "ladder" or "fire", in order to collect these objects. One of Super Scribblenauts' features is the ability to add characteristics to objects, such as a "green refrigerator" or "anthropomorphic antimatter". More than one adjective can be tied to a single object, making it possible to summon objects such as "big flying purple pregnant octopus". Players control the main character, Maxwell, using either the touch screen, D-pad, or face buttons. Maxwell is a boy who has a magical notebook that makes written words come to life. Creating new objects with that notebook to solve puzzles is the key to the game.

The game includes a hint system as well as an improved level editor. Hints can be purchased with Ollars, the currency in Scribblenauts. The level editor allows the player to create various types of levels such as playgrounds (objectiveless levels that allows players to goof off, test combinations, or create words for Ollars) or adventure missions, and allows the player to pre-spawn objects via notebook icon. This game also introduces the Create-a-Tron in some levels, which is a machine where the player must put various objects inside of it to create something. There are also achievements that the player can earn.

== Plot ==
Maxwell, the game's protagonist, is tasked with using his magical Notepad to collect Starites. Each set of levels is represented by a constellation, which can be selected at the main menu. At the end of the game, Maxwell comes face to face with his evil Doppelganger who steals the last Starite from him. Maxwell chases him to the moon, where the Doppelganger crashes his UFO, seemingly defeated. The game tells the player that since the final Starite was destroyed in the crash, to "write the answer" to beat the game's final level. After beating the game, two bonus constellations are introduced with levels focused on simply getting to the Starite.

== Development ==
In July 2009, when asked in an interview about a possible Scribblenauts sequel, creative director Jeremiah Slaczka stated, "We're just focused on the original Scribblenauts for the time being, but I have plenty of ideas for a sequel. If you look at Drawn to Life: The Next Chapter (DS) you can see how we don't just do rehashes when we make a sequel. That game was rebuilt from the ground up and it's fantastic. We take sequels very seriously." In August 2009, Slaczka announced that Scribblenauts and Drawn to Life: The Next Chapter would be 5th Cell’s “last hurrah” for original DS games, as the company planned to shift its focus to console development. He later clarified that there were future plans for Scribblenauts, saying, “I really like Scribblenauts and think there's a lot of potential there, so we'll see what happens,” and added that fans shouldn't expect any “farmed-out spin-offs” like Drawn to Life: SpongeBob SquarePants Edition, which had been developed by Altron without 5th Cell’s involvement. In September 2009, in an interview included in the Scribblenauts Prima Games guidebook, Slaczka stated, in response to a question regarding a sequel, "Like most games, that really depends on how the original game does." Two days later, in an interview published after Scribblenauts was released, he reiterated his interest, stating, "Yeah, if it's successful. It’s up to WB, so we’ll see where it goes.

The game was first teased in April 2010, appearing on the cover of Nintendo Power #253 under the title “The Next Scribblenauts.” It was offically announced a month later as Super Scribblenauts, with additional gameplay details and a fall 2010 release window for the DS.

When developing Super Scribblenauts, 5th Cell decided to prioritize the puzzle aspect of the series over the action levels in order to improve replayability and reduce repetition. In Scribblenauts, it was found that many action levels could be completed using similar or identical combinations of objects, causing players to repeatedly use the same solutions. In response, 5th Cell fine-tuned the puzzles to make the experience more unique and moved action levels to several optional worlds unlocked upon beating the game.

== Release ==
Super Scribblenauts was released in North America on October 12, 2010, and launched in other countries later that month. In the United States, pre-order bonuses included plush headphones available in grey, polka dot, and camouflage patterns. In Japan, the game was released on October 13, 2011. Unlike Scribblenauts, which had been localized as Flash Puzzle: Maxwell's Mysterious Notebook, Super Scribblenauts kept its English title.

A selection of levels from Super Scribblenauts was included in the mobile game Scribblenauts Remix, released on October 11th, 2011.

In February 2013, Super Scribblenauts was included alongside Scribblenauts in a collection for the Nintendo DS titled Scribblenauts Collection.

== Reception ==
Reception

Aggregate score
Aggregator	Score
Metacritic	81/100

Review scores
Publication	Score
1Up.com	A-
Eurogamer	8/10
G4	3/5
GameRevolution	B+
GameSpot	6.5/10
GamesRadar+	9/10
IGN	9.0/10
Nintendo Power	8.5/10
Official Nintendo Magazine	86%

Super Scribblenauts has received generally favorable reviews. It currently holds a score of 81/100 on Metacritic. It holds an 8/10 on Eurogamer and a 9.0/10 on IGN. IGN's Daemon Hatfield called Super Scribblenauts fun and imaginative. He also praised the game's refined control scheme and incorporation of adjectives, but criticized its low level of difficulty. The British magazine ONM gave it an 86%, saying that "it's a step above the original, nearly everything's improved here and the addition to adjectives is heartwarming. A good step in the right direction for Scribblenauts".

GameSpot, however, was not nearly as ecstatic about the game, giving it a 6.5/10 and criticizing its restrictions on user creativity and lack of "real-world logic".

During the 14th Annual Interactive Achievement Awards, the Academy of Interactive Arts & Sciences nominated Super Scribblenauts for "Outstanding Achievement in Gameplay Engineering".
