= Scribblenauts Unlimited =

2012 video game

- Developers: 5th Cell; Shiver Entertainment (PS4, Switch, Xbox One)
- Publisher: Warner Bros. Interactive Entertainment: EU: Nintendo (3DS, Wii U)
- Director: Jeremiah Slaczka
- Designer: Sean Wissler
- Series: Scribblenauts
- Platforms: Nintendo 3DS; Wii U Microsoft Windows iOS; Android; Nintendo Switch; PlayStation 4 Xbox One
- Release: Nintendo 3DS: NA: November 13, 2012; Wii U: NA: November 18, 2012; AU: November 30, 2012; EU: December 6, 2013; Microsoft Windows: NA: November 19, 2012; AU: November 28, 2012; EU: February 15, 2013; iOS, Android: WW: December 16, 2015; Switch, PS4, Xbox One: WW: September 18, 2018
- Genres: Puzzle, sandbox
- Modes: Single-player, multiplayer

Scribblenauts Unlimited is a puzzle sandbox video game developed by 5th Cell and published by Warner Bros. Interactive Entertainment for the Nintendo 3DS, Wii U, Microsoft Windows, iOS and Android. It is the fourth title in the Scribblenauts series, as a launch title for the Wii U console. The game was later released alongside its successor Scribblenauts Unmasked in Scribblenauts Mega Pack in 2018 with extra content.

== Gameplay ==
The gameplay in Scribblenauts Unlimited is largely similar to previous entries in the series. Maxwell returns as the player character and the objective is still to collect Starites by using objects the player creates to complete various tasks. Scribblenauts Unlimited is more adventure-based than Scribblenauts and Super Scribblenauts. One of the primary differences with this game is that it takes place in a large overworld that is open to exploration, as opposed to the first two games in the series, where the player had to choose an individual puzzle to earn Starites. Players can traverse different themed areas and accept challenges from NPCs. Sometimes, this will transport the player to a self-contained level, much like earlier Scribblenauts titles, where the player must solve multiple puzzles before being awarded with a Starite. There are now also smaller challenges within the world that reward the player with Starite shards - collecting ten of these shards is another way to earn Starites. There are also male and female versions of all NPCs (including animals), as well as new functions for the time and arcade machines. Due to the additional power of the Wii U, a budget meter is no longer present allowing up to 60 objects to be displayed at the same time.

The game was built on an upgraded version of the Objectnaut engine, providing the player with several additional options when creating objects. As well as the adjective system that was introduced in Super Scribblenauts, players can now attach multiple objects to each other, for example, creating a dog with wheels. Furthermore, there are numerous properties that can be assigned to objects, such as movement and offensive capabilities. Players can also customize their objects with scaling and coloring tools, similar to another 5th Cell franchise, Drawn to Life. Customized objects can be named and saved - typing in the name of a saved custom object allows it to be spawned at any time. The Wii U version of the game can store more than 900 custom objects. Due to technical constraints, the 3DS version lacks this object editor.

=== Version differences ===
The Nintendo 3DS version of Scribblenauts Unlimited does not feature the object editor heavily promoted in advertisements for the game. Instead, it features communications via the 3DS's StreetPass and SpotPass communication modes. In addition, the iOS and Android versions do not include an object editor.

The Wii U version of Scribblenauts Unlimited contains a local multiplayer mode, as well as online support that allowed players to share and download each other's creations custom-made in the object editor with the community. Each player could store up to 900 objects, whether made by the player or downloaded from the community, but any player other than the first player in the local multiplayer mode of the game can not summon objects themselves. The Wii U version is the first game of the Scribblenauts series to be released on a home console. As a result, the game has been given a revamped high-definition visual style. The Wii U version also has exclusive cameo objects of characters and items from the Super Mario and Legend of Zelda games, which later returned in the European release of both Wii U and 3DS versions.

The Microsoft Windows version of Scribblenauts Unlimited is integrated with Steam Workshop to share custom objects within the community.

The iOS and Android versions feature revised touch controls suitable for multi-touch capacitive touchscreens, such as pinching to zoom in and out.

== Original soundtrack ==
The music of Scribblenauts Unlimited was composed by David J. Franco. The game consists of 30 primary level tracks, only 28 of which appear in the game in their original composed form. The majority of tracks have two remixes that were created by Tracy W. Bush, one with an exaggerated bass line and new beat arrangements, and one with the primary drum tracks stripped out. In addition to these 50 remix tracks, there are three menu tracks, two tracks for special case objects, two musical scores for the intro/outro, and three unused tracks. This brings the grand total to 90 unique tracks produced for the game.

Below are the 29 original songs, listed based on the level in which they first appear. Some songs appear on multiple levels, and each level has a rotating set of three songs:

- "Title" aka Classroom
- "Edwin's Farm"
- "Capital City" aka Downtown
- "The Under Line" aka Subway
- "Punctuation Plaza"
- "Capital City Runoff" aka Ocean Deep
- "Hyphen Heights" aka Suburbia
- "Full Stop Diner" aka Restaurant
- "Metaforest" aka Woods
- "Grave Manor" aka Haunted House
- "The Virgule Gallery" aka Grotto
- "Sir Guillemet's Castle"
- "Ruins of Ellipsis" aka Rainforest
- "Anaphora Falls" aka River
- "Bullet Point Bayou" aka Swamp
- "The Listy Colon" aka Ocean
- "Payper Plains" aka Grasslands
- "Payper N. Penitentiary" aka Mine
- "Abian Sea Front" aka Waterfront
- "Pilcrow Peaks" aka Snowypeaks
- "Dusty Brush Canyon"
- "Abjad Dunes"
- "Camelcase Oasis"
- "Tomb of Onomatopoeia" aka Pyramid
- "Ampersand Beach"
- "Vowelcano"
- "Storybook Keep"
- "Syntax Station"

=== Tracks that only appear as remixes ===
- "Underground" secondary tracks for Capital City and Payper N. Penitentiary
- "Temple" secondary tracks for Ruins Of Ellipsis and The Saurus Park

=== Other tracks ===
- "8Bit", "Time Past" - Special Case Objects
- "Game Over", "Object Editor", "Tally" aka The World Map - Menus
- "Pause", "Rumble", "Fast Travel" - Unused
- "5th Cell", "Starite Begin", "Starite Fail", "Starite Get!", "Starite Vision" - Jingles & Effects

== Plot ==
Compared to previous Scribblenauts titles, Scribblenauts Unlimited has a more extensive backstory and reveals the regular protagonist Maxwell's reason for collecting Starites. In the opening scene, narrated by Lily (Jennifer Hale), Maxwell's sister, the player learns that Maxwell's parents were travelers who later semi-retired and had 42 children. They gave Maxwell a magical notebook that can create any object by writing its respective word in it and Lily a magic globe that can be used to travel anywhere. Maxwell's parents show concern that he and Lily are becoming spoiled, however. One day, Maxwell comes across an old man who appears to be hungry. As a prank, Maxwell uses his notebook to create a rotten apple and gives it to the man. Angered, the old man scolds Maxwell for being spoiled and curses Lily, causing her to slowly turn to stone. Maxwell brings Lily to their brother Edwin's farm. Edwin teaches Maxwell about "Starites" (which are gained by helping other people), which Maxwell must collect to free Lily from the curse. Maxwell vows to help as many people as he can and leaves the farm. After collecting Starites, Maxwell lifts the curse on Lily, and the old man is revealed to be Maxwell's father in disguise. He cast the curse on Lily to teach Maxwell to be a better person. Maxwell's father is forgiven, and all is well in the world again.

== Development ==
When Nintendo first approached 5th Cell about the Wii U, the studio had already begun prototyping a Scribblenauts game for the Wii. After seeing the prototype of the Wii U GamePad, the team felt it would be a better way to bring the series' writing mechanics to consoles than using pointer controls with the Wii Remote and an on-screen keyboard. Warner Bros. Interactive Entertainment agreed after seeing the Wii U themselves, and development subsequently shifted to the new system. Additionally, Jeremiah Slaczka stated that Unlimited would not have been possible without the Wii U, as several of the game's features could not have been implemented on either the DS or Wii due to hardware limitations.

Scribblenauts Unlimited was first announced at E3 in June 2012., teasing the new Object Editor, multiplayer mode, and the fact that it would be available for both the 3DS and Wii U, the first time a Scribblenauts game would be available on a home console. In September, it was announced that Unlimited would be a launch title for the Wii U in November 2012, and PC was confirmed as an additional release platform.

The decision to remove linear levels and contain objectives in open locations came from the idea that the next game should include more playgrounds, as the previous games only had a sandbox area to mess around in on the title screen. Traditional multiplayer was never considered due to the Wii U only allowing one Gamepad to be connected at a time. Additionally, there were concerns about frame rate issues while having multiple players spawning objects at the same time. A multiplayer versus mode was briefly considered but was removed because the developers didn’t find it fun and felt it was an unnecessary distraction from the story mode.

== Release ==
Scribblenauts Unlimited was released in North America for the 3DS first on November 13, 2012. Similar to the original DS title, pre-order bonuses at GameStop included a replica of Maxwell's rooster hat alongside new hats based on the characters Lily and Doppelganger. Also exclusive to GameStop was a special edition for 3DS that came with a pencil-shaped stylus and a 3DS case modeled after Maxwell's head. The Wii U version launched the same day as the console on November 18, 2012, and PC came out the following day on November 19 with both a physical disc and digital version via Steam. Players who pre-ordered on Steam received a wearable version of Maxwell's rooster hat in Team Fortress 2, called the Cockfighter. Unlimited had different release dates for each system to intentionally help reduce crunch for the developers.

In Europe, Scribblenauts Unlimited was delayed twice and wasn't released on PC until February 2013 and consoles until December 2013. The first delay was announced on November 22, 2012, a few days before the Wii U's European release on November 30. In response, Jeremiah Slaczka stated the delay had been caused by "things outside of development" that he was unable to talk about. On February 5, 2013, Nintendo recalled and delayed the Wii U and 3DS versions three days before their rescheduled release on February 8, claiming that there were important last-minute changes that needed to be implemented. Despite this, the digital version temperarly became available on the Wii U eShop on February 8 for a few hours before being removed. On August 29, it was announced during a Nintendo Direct that the game would be released in December, with the exact release date of December 6, 2013, confirmed a few days later on October 1.

A mobile version for iOS and Android was released on December 16, 2015.

== Reception ==
Reception

Aggregate score
| Aggregator | Score |
|---|---|
| Metacritic | 3DS: 73/100; Wii U: 73/100; PC: 75/100 |

Review scores
| Publication | Score |
|---|---|
| Destructoid | 5/10 |
| IGN | Wii U: 8.8/10 |
| Nintendo World Report | 9/10 |
| TouchArcade | 4/5 |

Scribblenauts Unlimited has received generally favorable reviews. IGN gave the Wii U version an 8.8 out of 10, praising its creativity and level progression, though noting its difficulty was low, and the Nintendo characters were limited. Nintendo World Report gave the Wii U version a 9 out of 10, praising its use of the GamePad, its engaging gameplay, and the new object editor. Destructoid's James Stephanie Sterling was less positive, giving it a 5.0 out of 10, calling it limited, panning its simplicity and stating that "it's not actually worth it to be inventive".

In March 2013, the game was nominated for and won the Best Casual/Puzzle Game category of the Pocket Gamer Awards.
