= Run Roo Run =

2012 video game

- App Store art
- Developer: 5th Cell
- Publisher: 5th Cell
- Director: Jeremiah Slaczka
- Designers: Jeremiah Slaczka; Adam Fenderson
- Programmer: Marius Falhbusch
- Artist: Chern Fai Chow
- Composers: David J. Franco; Tracy W. Bush
- Platform: iOS
- Release: WW: January 12, 2012
- Genre: Platform
- Mode: Single-player

Run Roo Run is a platform video game developed and published by 5th Cell for iOS. It was released worldwide on January 12, 2012. The game was announced two days prior to its release, and is the second release from 5th Cell for the iOS platform.

The game's plot revolves around a mother kangaroo in search of her captured joey. The game takes place in Australia, where Roo travels from Perth to Sydney.

Run Roo Run is unique in its gameplay for modern platform games in that it is not a side-scrolling video game. Each level is a single screen that introduces a new element of complexity. For this reason, 5th Cell refers to the game's genre as "micro-platformer". It features Game Center integration, but is a single-player title.

== Gameplay ==
Gameplay in Run Roo Run is simplistic in control. Since the game employs auto-run, the player controls Roo only in the character's jumping movements. While a platform game, Run Roo Run is unique in that it is not a side-scrolling video game. Each level is a single screen that introduces new elements of complexity. Each chapter of the game consists of several levels, in which different grades can be achieved depending on the time a player takes to complete each level. A completed chapter represents a move East on the map, and an "Extreme" set of levels are unlocked for each chapter.

== Development ==
After playing the Flash game Space is Key by independent developer Chris Jeff, director Jeremiah Slaczka gained inspiration for creating a new video game. Slaczka conceived of the game's basic concept several months prior to game development. Development for Run Roo Run began in September 2011. It was originally meant to be a much smaller project for 5th Cell, with only six weeks of projected development time. However, an additional three months was necessary to complete the game as it became larger-scale.

The game was released worldwide on January 12, 2012 for iOS. The game marks 5th Cell's first new game series since Scribblenauts was released, and is 5th Cell's first self-published title.

== Reception ==
Reception

Aggregate score
Aggregator	Score
Metacritic	83/100

Review scores
Publication	Score
Edge	5/10
IGN	8.0/10.0
Pocket Gamer	8/10

IGN's Justin Davis praised Run Roo Run's gameplay, noting that "the bite-sized nature of each stage is genius." When discussing the overall game, he stated that "Run Roo Run looks, sounds and plays great." However, video game magazine Edge gave the game a mixed review; "It's becoming a 5th Cell tradition: strong ideas compromised by erratic level design and structural weaknesses. One day, the developer will find the right balance to support its undeniable creativity, but sadly, it hasn't found it here."

1UP.com's Chris Pereira stated "the music does become grating as you play (if you play for long enough in one sitting), and the standard levels can be too easy and ask too little of you at times. But the game is made so well for the platform -- you can pick it up, play a level, and go back to what you were doing 30 seconds later, or sit there for an hour -- that it's not difficult to look past those issues."
