= Scribblenauts (video game) =

2009 puzzle video game

- Cover art for Nintendo DS
- Developer: 5th Cell
- Publisher: Warner Bros. Interactive Entertainment
- Director: Jeremiah Slaczka
- Producers: Joshua Billeaudeau; Kirsten Gavoni
- Designer: Matt Cox
- Programmer: Marius Fahlbusch
- Artist: Edison Yan
- Composer: David J. Franco
- Series: Scribblenauts
- Platform: Nintendo DS
- Release: NA: September 15, 2009; AU: September 30, 2009; EU: October 9, 2009; JP: January 27, 2011
- Genres: Emergent, puzzle, action platform
- Mode: Single-player

Scribblenauts is an emergent puzzle action video game developed by 5th Cell and published by Warner Bros. Interactive Entertainment for the Nintendo DS. The game was released in 2009 in all regions except Japan, and in 2011 in Japan as Flash Puzzle: Maxwell's Mysterious Notebook (Note: Japanese: ヒラメキパズル マックスウェルの不思議なノート, Hepburn: Hirameki Pazuru: Makkusuweru no Fushigi na Nōto) by Konami. It is the third Nintendo DS video game made by 5th Cell, the first two being Drawn to Life and Lock's Quest. The objective of Scribblenauts, as implied by its catchphrase "Write Anything, Solve Everything", is to complete puzzles to collect "Starites", helped by the player's ability to summon any object (from a database of tens of thousands) by writing its name on the touchscreen. The game is considered by its developers to help promote emergent gameplay by challenging the player to solve its puzzles within certain limitations or through multiple solutions.

Jeremiah Slaczka, creator and director of Scribblenauts, envisioned the game as a combination of solving life situation puzzles alongside Mad Libs. His vision was brought to realization through the "Objectnaut" engine created by 5th Cell's technical director, Marius Fahlbusch. Objectnaut allowed for a data driven approach, and a significant portion of the development time was spent researching nouns and their properties, and categorizing them into the Objectnaut database. This, along with the simple art designs of 5th Cell's Edison Yan, allowed for the team to easily add new words to the database without expending much effort to program new behavior.

Scribblenauts was first shown in a playable form at the 2009 Electronic Entertainment Expo, and became a sleeper hit, winning several "Best of Show" awards, being the first portable console title to win such praise. Reviewers believed that 5th Cell delivered on their promise to allow nearly any possible object to be created for use in Scribblenauts, but also lamented that the choice of controls in the game hampered their full enjoyment of the title. The success of the title has led to a number of sequels including Super Scribblenauts, Scribblenauts Remix, and Scribblenauts Unlimited. The series has sold over 13 million copies.

== Gameplay ==
Screenshot of Scribblenauts. The top screen displays an image of the level and various indicators. The bottom screen shows Maxwell, using a helicopter and rope to rescue an injured woman during one of the puzzle levels.

Scribblenauts is an exclusively side-scrolling game controlled almost entirely with the Nintendo DS stylus, with the D-pad and face buttons controlling the camera and the left and right shoulder buttons rotating objects. The player controls a character named Maxwell, who must collect objects called "Starites" to complete each level. Maxwell is guided by tapping the touchscreen, or if the player taps an object, Maxwell will pick it up or be given other options for interacting with that object, such as riding a horse or bicycle or shooting at an object if he holds a weapon. A fundamental element of Scribblenauts is the ability of the player to summon myriad objects into the game. This is achieved by writing the name of an object on the touchscreen. For example, the player can write "ladder", summoning a ladder, which the player may use to climb to an out-of-reach Starite. The player may turn the ladder on its side and set it on fire. The player may also chain objects together, such as chaining a piece of meat to a pole and holding it while riding on a raptor.

Summoned objects range among animals, weapons, forces of nature, famous people (both fictional and real), vehicles, household objects, easter eggs of the development team, and even internet memes. However, the game does not include trademarked terms, nor potential profanity (summoning "ass" will spawn a donkey; summoning "cock" will spawn a rooster). The game includes a homonym system to offer the player possible choices between similar-sounding objects, such as distinguishing between a toy balloon and a hot-air balloon; there is also a spellchecker to provide close matches for misspelled words. The North American release includes support for other languages including Brazilian Portuguese, French, and Spanish, with French-Canadian and Latin American variants available for words in the French and Spanish language sets, respectively. The UK version also accounts for difference between American and British English, such as the differing meanings of the word "football". 5th Cell has stated that the limit to what objects may be summoned is up to the player's imagination. Players, using special software, claimed to have discovered that the full list of words tallies at 22,802 unique entries. In response, Slaczka said: "That was leaked by a hacker who does not know anything. It's more than that".

The game is segmented into 220 levels over 10 themed areas with 22 levels per world, and each given a 4 star ranking based on its difficulty, with later areas featuring more high ranked levels. Puzzles are given a par for the number of objects they can summon, typically being between two and four, though the player is free to summon more, so long as there is space in the meter at the top screen (summoning the same number of objects as the par or less earns more points). There are two types of levels—puzzle and action levels. Puzzle levels are real-life situations (such as having to open a piñata) where the Starite is awarded once the puzzle is solved, while action levels will appeal to gamers that prefer side-scrolling platformers, featuring switches, spike traps, and other similar elements. Players are awarded "merits" for completing levels while meeting certain requirements, such as not summoning any weapon-like object. Once the player completes a level, a silver star appears on the level selection button and a "Free play" mode is unlocked. At that point, the player is given the option to play through the level three consecutive times without reusing objects. Successfully completing the challenge grants the player a gold star for that level. Scribblenauts presents a simplistic storyline, as the developers wished to focus on engaging gameplay. The game always rewards the player with "Ollars", its in-game money, to allow them to purchase new areas, different avatars and other visual changes to the game.

The game includes a level editor, allowing users to share these levels over the Nintendo Wi-Fi system. The player can start with any level that they have already beaten from the main game, and add new objects with new game properties. These new properties can vary significantly from the normal behavior, such as having a bear able to eat a plane.

== Development ==
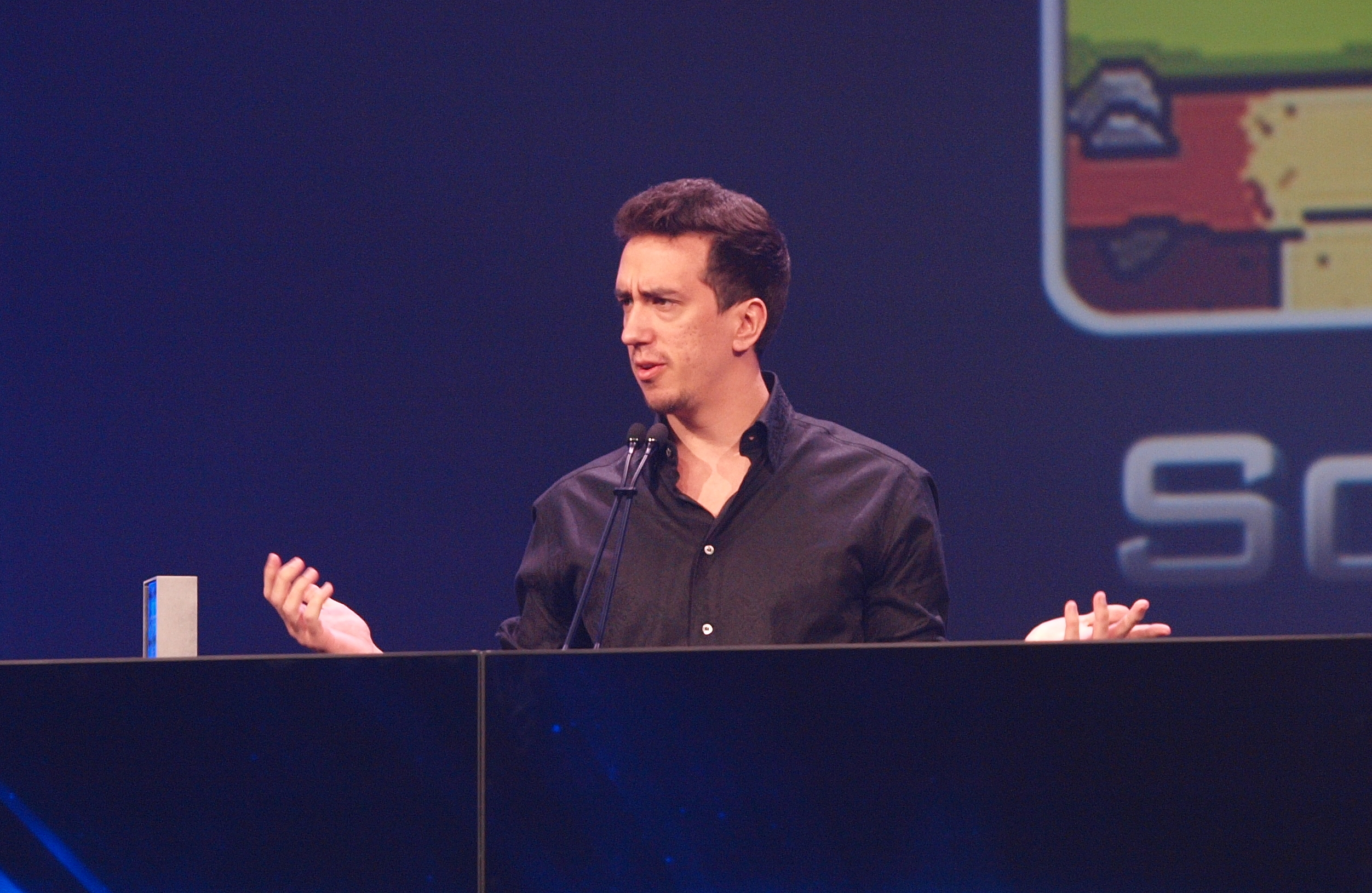
Jeremiah Slaczka, creative director for 5th Cell, upon receiving the Game Developers Choice Award for Best Handheld Game for Scribblenauts during the 2010 Game Developers Conference

Scribblenauts was first conceived in the second quarter of 2007, near the same time that they had envisioned Lock's Quest. Creative Director for 5th Cell, Jeremiah Slaczka, stated that they were seeking counterparts of Nintendogs and Brain Age, games that had attracted a much wider demographic than most other niche games, that 5th Cell could develop. The concept of Scribblenauts came from a combination of a previous idea he had for the DS that was similar to Mad Libs and a dream of his. An example given for the Mad Libs was that players could write a Mad Lib of a "dog walking through a forest", and a dog would appear in a forest and walk through it, but he realized the game would be tedious and that players would only be interested in using keywords. The dream was of being inside an Aztec temple and having to solve puzzles; one in particular involved three paintings, with the objective being straightening them and then moving on to the next room through a portal. While he thought it was a good idea for a game, he also felt that it lacked both a hook and replayability. He debated whether this would work best on the Wii or the DS, but later decided to combine the writing element with a puzzle element to fix the lack of replayability. Slaczka realized that the concept of the game might be considered impossible by other programmers, but found that 5th Cell's Technical Director Marius Fahlbusch felt confident they could create the required elements. The developers considered that the nature of the flexible and sometimes unforeseen solutions made the game strongly promote emergent gameplay.

During development, Slaczka and the team tried to figure out what they could do with the DS hardware, trying to make Scribblenauts appeal to everyone. As Lock's Quest was thought of first, they focused on releasing that game first while beginning the development of Scribblenauts. The game entered beta around May 2009, and had numerous play-testers exploring the game. About half of 5th Cell's staff worked on the game. It was developed alongside the DS version of Drawn to Life: The Next Chapter.

Scribblenauts was originally developed without having a publisher for the game. Slaczka noted that unlike other games where the developers could complete and polish a single level to garner interest while work on the rest of the game continued, Scribblenauts needed to show support for its large dictionary from the start, making it difficult to promote the game. The company was in negotiations with a publisher in the early part of 2009, letting that publisher decide when it would be best to announce the game. Warner Bros. Interactive Entertainment officially became the publisher for Scribblenauts that May. Slaczka noted that of the other publishers they talked to, they felt Warner Bros. was the best one, particularly due to their proximity to 5th Cell and their interest in the title.

Scribblenauts was originally titled "Wordplay", but the team felt that this was "generic". The title Scribblenauts began as a temporary name that would be effective for pitching the game, but as development proceeded, the team couldn't think of a better one, so the name stuck and became the final title of the product.

Konami published the game in Japan in January 2011; this localized version features Konami characters such as Old Snake, Manaka Takane and the Vic Viper.

=== Engine ===
The core engine of Scribblenauts is a data-driven engine called "Objectnaut" created by Fahlbusch. Within Objectnaut, each object is given a set of properties, including physical characteristics, artificial intelligence behavior, and how the player (through Maxwell) can interact with it. Five people from the team spent six months researching dictionaries and encyclopedias to create a large database of objects within the Objectnaut's framework, and then mapped out a hierarchy of data from this information. For example, every mammal-based object in the game is given the property of having "organic flesh", allowing it to be eaten or turned into meat, without having to specify these functions for each type of mammal they used. The Objectnaut approach allowed the team to create two distinct objects for words that may have similar meanings simply by adjusting each word's properties in the database: "lion", "tiger" and "leopard" while similar will behave differently and have different art assets, while the only difference in the game between "croissant" and "danish" is that the danish may be able to roll like a wheel. The team made sure to balance the abilities of the various objects that could be summoned to avoid creating an "uber character" that would act as a skeleton key for solving all of the levels, and give players more courage to try different elements. Slaczka noted that he would be frequently asked if certain difficult words were in the game when interviewed by the press, most of the time being able to respond affirmatively to these questions. In an example given by Slaczka, a "hardcore" journalist wanted twenty minutes with the game to try to stump it during the 2009 E3 convention, but, according to Slaczka, "he had a real hard time stumping it and shook my hand" after that period.

Designing each item required the developers to go word-by-word. Slaczka said that certain kinds of words, such as cheeses, require little to no differences, besides items such as Limburger which would scare people away from it. The developers used discretion when deciding what to make look different, providing a cyborg, robot, and android, which he felt were different enough to require their own individual designs. He later stated that there was no way to test out each item and each way they interact with another item, as it was virtually impossible for them to accomplish this, using an example of an airplane being frozen, brought back in time, placing an old man on top of it, bringing it back to present time, and setting it on fire. Slaczka said that while many games create a first level with enemies and platforms, polishing the level and moving on, the players can write any item available in level one that they can write in a later level. He commented that if players wrote "anvil" and it was missing its "heavy" property, they may be turned off of the game. They spent roughly 80% of the development fine-tuning the various items, and as such, they could not provide a preview to demonstrate the game.

Each of the words programmed into the game has associated art with it led by 5th Cell artist Edison Yan. The task of creating the art was simplified through the "minimal" design style of 5th Cell's previous games. Each object is rendered as in 3D with objects acting as doll on a 2D plane. This was chosen to avoid having to create a large number of animations for 2D. The development team had to design each AI-controlled object by hand, according to Slaczka, describing how the objects moves, and what it likes and dislikes, how much health it has, and other possible characteristics. Level design focused on providing a large variety of situations, including splitting levels between Puzzle and Action types, to avoid having the player develop a limited toolbox of common words and not exploring other possible solutions. Much of the initial level development was done on paper and to explore situations not commonly found in video games, due to their vocabulary system. They ended up selecting more than a hundred levels out of over seven hundred they had generated internally for the game. Both Merits and Ollars were added to reward the player for completion, with Slaczka comparing these to Xbox Live Achievements.

The game primarily uses the touchscreen to control Maxwell and other objects; the developers considered using the directional pad of the DS but realized that they would still need to rely on the touchscreen for certain actions and thus focused most of the game's controls through that interface. The game includes 5th Cell's own handwriting recognition system for writing down objects which Slaczka considered to be better than Nintendo's own system for Brain Age. The team included a virtual keyboard in addition to this system knowing that even "the human brain can't understand chicken scratch".

=== Promotion ===
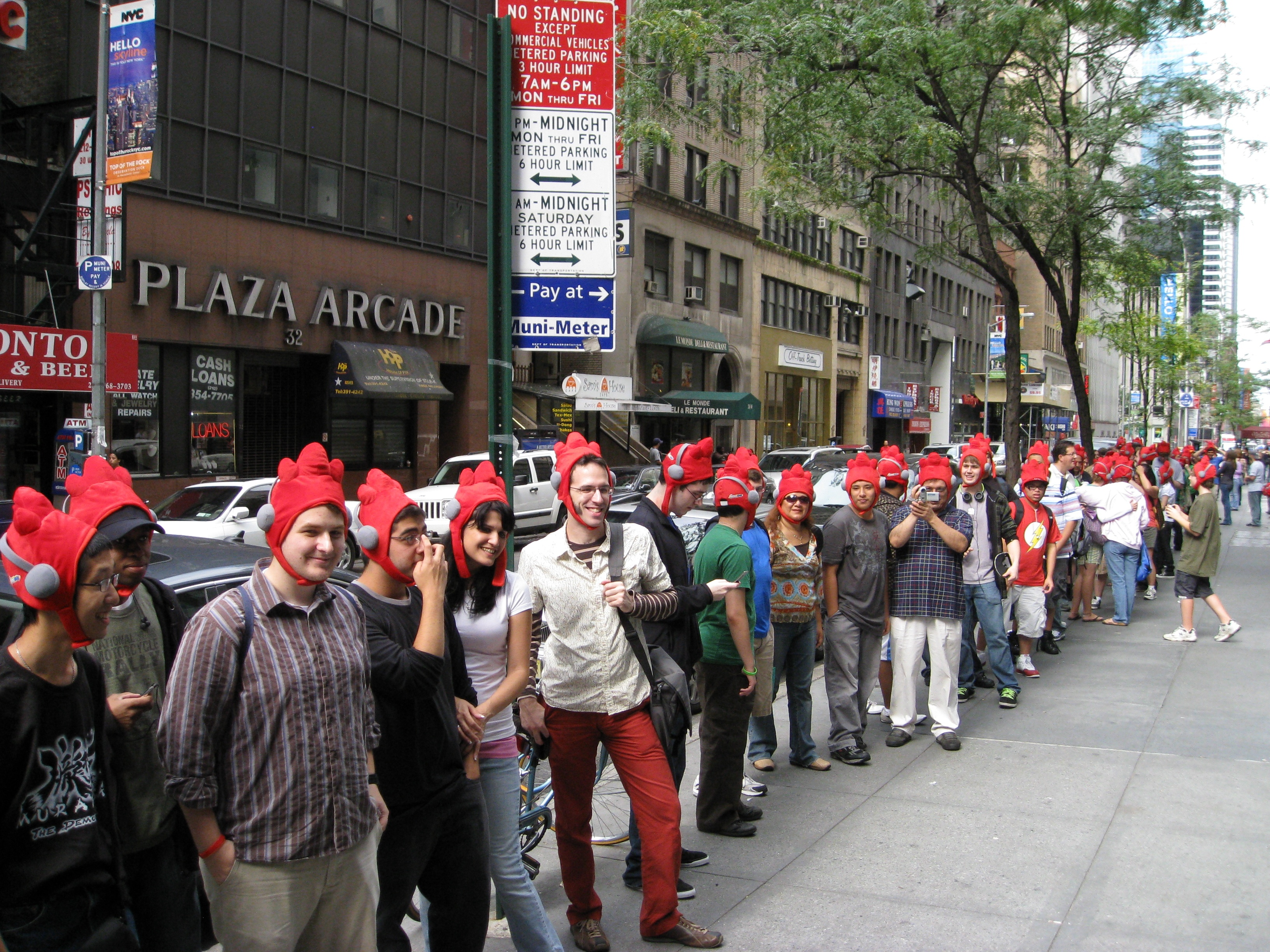
Customers with their "rooster hats" pre-order bonus for waiting in line for the start of Scribblenauts launch event on September 13, 2009, at the Nintendo World Store in New York City

Players who pre-ordered the game at GameStop and EB Games in the United States, Canada, and Australia received a replica of Maxwell's "rooster hat", a term coined by Destructoid according to Slaczka. The game was launched by a special event at the Nintendo World Store in New York City on September 13, 2009, with Slaczka and other 5th Cell developers on hand for the event.

== Rereleases ==
A selection of levels from Scribblenauts were included in the mobile game Scribblenauts Remix, released on October 11th, 2011. These levels were updated to support adjectives as well as other gameplay changes added in future games.

In February 2013, Scribblenauts was included alongside Super Scribblenauts in a collection for the Nintendo DS titled Scribblenauts Collection. Alongside minor bug fixes, the game was updated to support the D-Pad for movement controls alongside the touchscreen.

== Reception ==
=== Pre-release ===
The game was well received at the 2009 E3 Convention and was considered the "sleeper hit" of the show. Scribblenauts is the first portable video game in history to win "Best of Show" awards for E3 from any major gaming media outlet. The game was named "Best Original Game" and "Best Handheld Game" by the Game Critics Awards. Scribblenauts was named the overall "Best of Show" by GameSpot, GameSpy, and IGN, in addition to other awards. 1UP.com named Scribblenauts their E3's "Most Innovative" title. X-Play gave the game its E3 "Best Original Game" and "Best Handheld Game" awards. Ars Technica considered the game as the show's "Most Pleasant Surprise". Joystiq performed a ten-word test of the game, and found only one word, "plumbob", was not yet present in the game, but were promised it would be in the final version. Part of the success at E3 was considered partially due to the inclusion of then-recent Keyboard Cat Internet meme, which led to a grassroots-type excitement about the game at the convention. Adam Sessler of G4 TV believed that Scribblenauts' E3 success was from being a small but successful game from a small company in contrast to numerous other premier titles from other major developers and publishers that have become standard for the convention, such that the uniqueness of everything about the game made it the standout title of the show. Scribblenauts was given a much more predominate display in Warner Bros. Interactive's booth at the next major convention, the 2009 Comic-Con International. IGN listed Scribblenauts in a preview of Nintendo DS games in 2009, labeling it as one of their top picks for the year. They described it as "quite possibly one of the system's most ambitious designs yet".

"Post 217" as drawn by 5th Cell artist Edison Yan, based on a NeoGAF post, has been used as promotional material for the game.

One example of the possibilities of Scribblenauts that led to further attention to the game are given in the ESRB's attempt to describe the "cartoon violence" and "comic mischief" within the game as to grant it an "E10+" rating. The ESRB's description includes possible examples of the game's level of violence as "a club can be used to hit an animal; steak can be attached to a baby to attract lions; rockets can be lobbed at a man". In a post at NeoGAF within a thread dedicated to the game, user "Feep" relayed the experience of discovering during E3 that he was able to go back in time with a time machine to collect a dinosaur in order to defeat an army of robot zombies that could not be defeated with regular weapons. The story, as memorialized as "Post 217", has led to 5th Cell artist Edison Yan creating a desktop wallpaper image of the story, in appreciation of the positive fan response to the game, and the terms "Post Two One Seven", "Feep", and "Neogaf" have been included as summonable objects in the game. Jeremiah Slaczka credits the word-of-mouth popularity of "Post 217" for part of the game's success at E3, and noted that he had contacted Feep to gain his permission to include "Feep" (appearing as a robot zombie) within the game. The NeoGAF forums proceeded to expand on their praise for the game by creating a series of avatars of video game and other related characters (which will not otherwise appear in the game due to trademark issues) for their forums inspired by Yan's art design, and some of the members that created the avatars were contacted to work in the second game, Super Scribblenauts. Yan himself has drawn several more avatars in the same style for other games such as Street Fighter II and Final Fantasy VII.

=== Release ===
Reception

Aggregate score
Aggregator	Score
Metacritic	79/100

Review scores
Publication	Score
1Up.com	B+
Eurogamer	7/10
G4	4/5
Game Informer	8.75/10
GameSpy	4.5/5
IGN	8.7/10

Scribblenauts was found by reviewers to live up to the premise that the game was built on the ability to bring about nearly any object imagined into the game. John Walker of Eurogamer considered the game "an incredible achievement", with its word database "so utterly complete in its collection of everything ever in the universe". Craig Harris of IGN asserted that "the developers fully deliver on [the] promise" of allowing players to summon nearly any imagined object, and the core game alone is an "incredibly versatile Nintendo DS experience". Ben Kuchera of Ars Technica praises the game as "undeniably new and impressive" and urged players to support games that take risks with their innovation. Ray Barnholt of 1UP.com noted that while the game "isn't exactly the be-all end-all videogame" that it received prior to release, the game remains "unmissable" due to its sheer novelty value. The game's feature of forcing the player to consider different solutions when replaying levels was seen by Anthony Gallegos of GameSpy as a "really clever way to encourage replayability while subtly upping the challenge".

The common criticism among reviewers was the game's poor controls, to the point that the implementation "almost kills a fantastic game", according to IGN's Harris. Reviews specifically commented how the touch screen is used both to manipulate the objects placed in the game and to move Maxwell; this would result in inadvertently having Maxwell walk to his death or to disrupt a delicately prepared arrangement of objects prior to being ready to move him. Craig Harris of IGN notes that while one can direct Maxwell indirectly, the character would often fail to avoid or overcome simple obstacles, similar to troop movements in real-time strategy games, such that overcoming these issues requires a significant amount of precise controls by the player. It was suggested that while it was understood why 5th Cell opted to use the touchscreen in this manner to avoid too much flipping between the stylus and face-button controls, they would have appreciated the option for customizing the controls. The decision to use the touch screen controls was described by Walker as "possibly the most wildly stupid design decision of all time", and that if the movement controls were mapped to the face buttons, the game would have been a "beautiful thing". Walker also questioned the choice to have the game's camera snap back to Maxwell as soon as the controls for it were released by the player, as it made it both difficult to set up objects that were off-screen from Maxwell, and to watch the results of certain interactions, such as fights between computer-controlled characters, that occurred off-screen.

When it is possible to connect objects to other objects, reviewers found that finding the connection points to be difficult, and would often trigger Maxwell to move. Barnholt described the entire game as feeling like a prototype with its odd physics, and not as polished as 5th Cell's previous games, though acknowledged the overall game is still an impressive feat for the small development team. IGN's Ryan Geddes criticized the game's poor controls and physics, demanding patience to overcome, and raised concerns that the title was rushed to market after its overwhelming positive response from the E3 convention. In a postmortem, 5th Cell's co-founder Joseph Tringali said that they were aware that the controls would take "a big hit" from game reviewers, and attempted to work in a face-button control scheme, but would have not been able to complete it within the deadline set by their self-funded schedule. Tringali further noted that they did not spend as much time on the stylus controls earlier in development, and would have considered sacrificing another feature, like the Nintendo Wi-Fi, to improve them.

Reviewers also identified some unexpected behavior from some objects or combinations of them, such as attempting to direct a non-player character in picking up an object, leading to an inconsistency in the difficulty of the various puzzles. Ben Kuchera of Ars Technica, in calling Scribblenauts "a frustrating, often maddening game", described that he often encounters puzzles that, after trying several solutions that should have worked by common sense, he eventually happened upon a less logical solution that worked. Walker considered the puzzles range "between uninspired and simple and frustratingly obscure and fiddly". Many critics experienced that after getting stumped on a puzzle, they would often resort to playing around in the free play mode. Edge magazine identified that the free play mode was more enjoyable as it masked the problems with controls, physics, and the general structure of the puzzle game that followed it, and considered what improvements in these modes could be made to create an experience closer to that of LittleBigPlanet. In particular for the action levels, reviewers found that they would be less likely to explore alternate solutions and fall into the pattern of using the same set of objects, making these levels repetitive towards the end. On the other hand, the puzzle levels were well-received; Andrew Reiner of Game Informer wrote that the time spent while solving the puzzle levels was when his "creative juices were joyously sapped". The presence of the "Ollars" currency system allows players to skip levels they found difficult. Kurchera also noted that with some puzzles, the game is often better played with others, including young children, as the combination of imaginative ideas will likely eventually stumble upon a solution. Simon Parkin of Game Set Watch agreed, believing the game is best enjoyed when one thinks like a child as "free of the dry, efficient logic of adulthood, a child's imagination also opens the game up in ways beyond most adults' reach". Seth Schiesel of the New York Times considers the ultimate experience of the game a let-down after the E3 hype due to the controls and obfuscation of the puzzles, and though it was not a "great game", he considers the concept a "great idea" that can be built upon for a possible sequel.

According to the NPD Group, Scribblenauts sold 194,000 units in the United States during September 2009, following Mario & Luigi: Bowser's Inside Story and Kingdom Hearts 358/2 Days in top Nintendo DS sales. The game also showed strong sales during December 2009, becoming the 16th best selling game of that month in North America. By February 2010, the game had sold more than one million units worldwide. It was the 5th best-selling Nintendo DS game for 2009 in North America and the 1st best selling 3rd party game on DS.

Time named Scribblenauts the 7th best video game of 2009. During the 13th Annual Interactive Achievement Awards, the Academy of Interactive Arts & Sciences awarded Scribblenauts with "Outstanding Innovation in Gaming", "Portable Game of the Year", and "Outstanding Achievement in Portable Game Design"; it also received a nomination for "Casual Game of the Year". The game won "Innovation" and "Best Handheld Game" at the 10th annual Game Developers Choice Awards.

=== Controversy ===
Shortly after the game's release, a minor controversy was stirred after players discovered the word "sambo" could be summoned as a synonym for "watermelon". As "sambo" is widely used as a slur against African-Americans, many believed this to be a deliberate act of racism. According to developer Jeremiah Slaczka, this was simply an unfortunate accident in his quest to include every single word he came across in the dictionary into the game. He was also under the impression that the definition of the word referred to a "fig leaf ground" used in the Ecuadorian dish fanesca and was unaware it was even considered a slur. The word "sambo" has been omitted from the Scribblenauts dictionary in every subsequent title.

=== Lawsuit ===
In May 2013, Charles Schmidt and Christopher Orlando Torres, the creators of the Keyboard Cat and Nyan Cat characters respectively, jointly sued 5th Cell and Warner Bros. for copyright infringement and trademark infringement for the appearances of these characters without permission across Scribblenauts and its sequels. Schmidt and Torres have both registered copyrights on their characters and have pending trademark applications on the names. The case was settled out of court, with Warner Bros. officially licensing the two cat characters for use in it.

== Sequels ==
=== Super Scribblenauts ===
A Nintendo DS sequel to Scribblenauts titled Super Scribblenauts was released on October 12, 2010. In addition to addressing issues with the control scheme, Super Scribblenauts includes a larger vocabulary including the use of adjectives to modify nouns, influencing the objects' behavior.

=== Scribblenauts Remix ===
Scribblenauts Remix, a version of Scribblenauts for the iOS platform, was released by Warner Bros. Interactive on October 12, 2011. Ported to the platform by developers Iron Galaxy, the iOS version provides forty levels from both Scribblenauts and its sequel, along with ten new levels for the iOS game. The mechanics of the game are based on Super Scribblenauts, allowing for the use of adjectives in addition to nouns. The game uses built-in features of iOS, such as the touch keyboard, and was released simultaneously with iOS 5, incorporating new features such as cloud storage to play the game across multiple devices. An Android version was released on June 26, 2013.

=== Scribblenauts Unlimited ===
A fourth title, Scribblenauts Unlimited, was released for Wii U, PC, and Nintendo 3DS on November 13, 2012. It features multiple worlds which Maxwell must find out how to help various non-player characters to gain Starites, using the extended vocabulary abilities of Super Scribblenauts to solve puzzles. iOS and Android versions were both released on December 15, 2015. Ports for PlayStation 4, Nintendo Switch, and Xbox One were released on September 18, 2018.

=== Scribblenauts Unmasked: A DC Comics Adventure ===
A fifth game in the franchise, Scribblenauts Unmasked: A DC Comics Adventure, was released for Wii U, PC, and Nintendo 3DS, featuring over 2000 characters from the DC Comics universe. The game was released on September 24, 2013. Like Unlimited, Unmasked has ports for PlayStation 4, Nintendo Switch, and Xbox One, which were released on September 18, 2018. In this case, the two of them are packaged together.

=== Scribblenauts: Fighting Words ===
A sixth game in the series, titled Scribblenauts: Fighting Words was in development for iOS since 2014, but was cancelled in 2016 after 5th Cell laid off 45 employees, including lead animator Tim Borrelli.

=== Scribblenauts Showdown ===
Scribblenauts Showdown is a party game for up to four players, using mini-games based on the Scribblenauts formula. The game was developed by Shiver Entertainment, published by Warner Bros. Interactive Entertainment, and released on the Nintendo Switch, PlayStation 4, and Xbox One on March 6, 2018, which marks the first game in the series released on Sony and Microsoft consoles.
