= 5th Cell =

Video game company

5th Cell Media, LLC.
- Type: Private
- Industry: Video games
- Predecessor: Epix Interactive Studios
- Founded: August 28, 2003
- Headquarters: Bellevue, Washington
- Key people: Jeremiah Slaczka (CEO & Creative Director); Joseph M. Tringali (COO); Marius Falhbusch (CTO)
- Products: Scribblenauts series Drawn to Life series Lock's Quest; Run Roo Run
- Number of employees: 25 (as of 2021)

5th Cell is an independently-owned American video game developer founded in 2003 as 5th Cell Media, LLC. Led by Jeremiah Slaczka and Marius Fahlbusch, the company is most well known for creating the Drawn to Life and Scribblenauts series. While the company remains a registered legal entity, it has been largely inactive since mass layoffs in 2016.

== Overview ==
Founded on August 28, 2003, by Joseph M. Tringali, Jeremiah Slaczka and Brett Caird, the company started out developing mobile games working with such publishers as THQ Wireless, JAMDAT Mobile (now EA Mobile) and UIEvolution (a former subsidiary of Square Enix).

On August 2, 2004, THQ Wireless announced it would publish 5th Cell's first three original mobile games: Siege, SEAL Team 6 and Mini Poccha.

In 2006, 5th Cell laid off fifteen employees due to the underperformance of their mobile titles, leaving only Tringali, Slaczka, and technical director Marius Fahlbusch. Shortly after, 5th Cell transitioned into Nintendo DS and casual game development. While they have worked with licenses and work for hire in the past, the core focus has moved completely onto building innovative, original video games.

In an IGN interview with Michael Thomsen, Jeremiah Slaczka, the company's creative director, was asked "What kinds of games do you ultimately want to be known for?". He responded by saying:

Innovative games – we want to be known as a company that produces AAA content you can't get anywhere else from anyone else. So far, with both Drawn to Life and Lock's Quest, I think our products have lined up with that vision. We've completely switched our company's focus to original titles now. We don't do licensed games or work for hire anymore.

On April 21, 2006, IGN revealed 5th Cell's first Nintendo DS game Drawn to Life, an original title.

On June 1, 2006, 5th Cell announced its partnership with Merscom to publish D.N.A, a PC casual game and also an original title.

On May 9, 2007, THQ announced it would publish Drawn to Life, an action-adventure/platformer hybrid with the unique twist of the player drawing the hero and the world itself using the DS's touchpad. THQ released the game worldwide in 2007 and 2008. According to Next-Gen.biz from the game's launch (September 2007) until March 1, 2008 (6 months) the game had sold 820,000 units worldwide and was ranked 61st of the top 100 selling video games of the last 12 months.

On April 2, 2008, THQ announced it was publishing 5th Cell's next Nintendo DS game, Lock's Quest, an original action-strategy game where the player first builds defenses and then battle against an invading clockwork army all racing against the clock.

On December 5, 2008, 5th Cell unveiled its next Nintendo DS game on IGN.com, Scribblenauts, an emergent action puzzle game where the player can write anything they can think of to help them solve the puzzle. On May 1, 2009, Warner Bros. Interactive Entertainment announced it would be publishing Scribblenauts. On September 15, 2009, Scribblenauts was released in North America, with its Australian release being on September 30 and European release on October 9. According to the NPD Group, Scribblenauts sold 194,000 units in the United States during September 2009, following Mario & Luigi: Bowser's Inside Story and Kingdom Hearts 358/2 Days in top Nintendo DS sales. A sequel, Super Scribblenauts was released on the DS in North America on October 12, 2010, Australia on October 27 and Europe on October 29. The game improved on many aspects of the original, adding more words, introducing adjectives and tweaking the controls to accommodate use of the D-Pad. A remake of the original Scribblenauts on iOS, called Scribblenauts Remix, was released by Warner Bros. Interactive on October 12, 2011. Instead of 5th Cell, it was actually ported to the platform by developers Iron Galaxy. The iOS version provides forty levels from both Scribblenauts and its sequel, along with ten new levels for the iOS.

At Nintendo's E3 2012 press conference, they announced the third game, Scribblenauts Unlimited, for both Wii U and Nintendo 3DS, marking the series' debut on the Nintendo 3DS platform, and on a home video game console, the Wii U. It saw release for Nintendo 3DS on November 13, 2012, and for Wii U and PC on November 18, 2012. The game was a lot different from its predecessors as it moved to a more adventure-based formula that relied on an open world filled with non-player characters, rather than choosing individual puzzles to earn Starites. It also introduced a new object editor which was present on the Wii U and PC versions, but not the 3DS version. A sequel, Scribblenauts Unmasked: A DC Comics Adventure, was released in September 2013 and featured characters and places from the DC Comics universe.

In 2015, 5th Cell tried to fund their new project Anchors in the Drift via crowdfunding website fig.co. The game was planned to be a free-to-play action-RPG, however, it didn't reach the funding goal of $500,000 and development stopped after the unsuccessful campaign.

On March 24, 2016, following the cancellation of the mobile game Scribblenauts: Fighting Words by publisher Warner Bros. Interactive Entertainment, heavy layoffs severely impacted the company. They remain in operation, but currently only a "tiny" number of employees remain.

In early 2021, 5th Cell started teasing their comeback with a new game, which was later announced as a free-to-play early access title on Steam titled Castlehold, released March 3, 2021. As of 2026, the game has seen no updates since April 21, 2021, and is still classified as early access.

In July 2026, 5th Cell announced their next game, Broke Wizards, a multiplayer party game, which released on Steam and the Epic Games Store on October 28, 2026.

== Original titles ==
Year	Title	Platform(s)	Publisher
2003	Mini Poccha	Mobile	THQ Mobile
2003	SEAL Team 6	Mobile	THQ Mobile
2003	Siege	Mobile	THQ Mobile
2006	D.N.A.	Mac OS, Microsoft Windows	Merscom
2007	Drawn to Life	Nintendo DS	THQ
2008	Lock's Quest	Nintendo DS	THQ
2009	Scribblenauts	Nintendo DS	Warner Bros. Interactive Entertainment
2009	Drawn to Life: The Next Chapter	Nintendo DS	THQ
2010	Super Scribblenauts	Nintendo DS	Warner Bros. Interactive Entertainment
2011	Scribblenauts Remix	Android, iOS	Warner Bros. Interactive Entertainment
2012	Run Roo Run	Android, iOS	Self-published
2012	Scribblenauts Unlimited	Wii U, PlayStation 4, Xbox One, Nintendo Switch, Microsoft Windows, Android, iOS, Nintendo 3DS	Warner Bros. Interactive Entertainment
2012	Hybrid	Xbox Live Arcade	Microsoft Studios
2013	Scribblenauts Unmasked: A DC Comics Adventure	Nintendo Switch, PlayStation 4, Xbox One, Microsoft Windows, Wii U, Nintendo 3DS	Warner Bros. Interactive Entertainment
2021	Castlehold	Microsoft Windows	Self-published
2026	Broke Wizards	Microsoft Windows	Self-published

=== Canceled ===
According to The Art of 5th Cell book, "As of 2014, 5th Cell has shipped 21 titles and there are 23 unreleased titles/concepts we worked on to various stages of completion"

- Scribblenauts Fighting Words, a puzzle RPG mobile spin-off of the Scribblenauts series, cancelled in 2016.
- Anchors in the Drift, an action RPG game cancelled in 2015. Came back as a game with the same name but that also got cancelled. It is believed that Anchors in the Drift may have been reworked into Castlehold.
- Scribblenauts Worlds, a 3D beat-em-up game cancelled in 2014.
- Unnamed Scribblenauts Wii game, a Scribblenauts game for the Nintendo Wii had been in development around 2011 for about a year before Nintendo gave 5th Cell the Wii U, and Scribblenauts Unlimited was developed instead.
- Unnamed Nintendo Wii Racer, a racing game planned for the Nintendo Wii system. Would have featured a similar mechanic to Sonic & All-Stars Racing Transformed allowing for vehicles to transform between cars, boats and planes mid-race depending on the obstacles on the course.
- Unnamed Mobile MMORPG, a MMORPG in development for mobile phones, canceled in 2005 due to lack of funding.
- Unnamed Nintendo Wii Dungeon Crawler, a dungeon crawler in development for the Nintendo Wii. Canceled for unknown reasons.
- Unknown PSP game, an unknown PSP game was canceled sometime in the mid-2000s in favor of 5TH Cell switching to the Nintendo DS since it was cheaper to develop for.

== Licensed titles ==
2004

- Lemony Snicket's A Series of Unfortunate Events (mobile) - published by Electronic Arts

2005

- Darts Pro! (mobile) - published by THQ
- Ministry of Sound: Club Manager (mobile) - published by THQ

2006

- Pat Sajak's Lucky Letters (mobile) - developed for UIEvolution (an ex-subsidiary of Square Enix)
- Moto GP Manager (mobile) - published by THQ
- Full Spectrum Warrior: Mobile (mobile) - published by THQ

== Spin-off titles ==
These are titles directly based on 5TH Cell's original games that were not developed by 5TH Cell themselves.

2008

- Drawn to Life: SpongeBob SquarePants Edition (DS) - developed by Altron, published by THQ

2009

- Drawn to Life: The Next Chapter (Wii) - developed by Planet Moon Studios, published by THQ

2011

- Scribblenauts Remix (iOS), (Android) - co-developed by Iron Galaxy Studios and 5TH Cell, published by Warner Bros. Interactive Entertainment

2018

- Scribblenauts Showdown (PlayStation 4, Xbox One, Nintendo Switch) - developed by Shiver, published by Warner Bros. Interactive Entertainment

2020

- Drawn to Life: Two Realms (Nintendo Switch, Steam, iOS, Android) - developed by Digital Continue, published by 505 Games
