= 13th Annual Interactive Achievement Awards =

Video game award ceremony

- Date: February 18, 2010
- Venue: Red Rock Casino, Resort & Spa
- Country: Las Vegas, Nevada, United States
- Hosted by: Jay Mohr

Highlights
- Most awards: Uncharted 2: Among Thieves (10)
- Most nominations: Uncharted 2: Among Thieves (15)
- Game of the Year: Uncharted 2: Among Thieves
- Hall of Fame: Mark Cerny
- Lifetime Achievement: Doug Lowenstein
- Pioneer: David Crane

The 13th Annual Interactive Achievement Awards was the 13th edition of the Interactive Achievement Awards, an annual awards event that honored the best games in the video game industry during 2009. The awards were arranged by the Academy of Interactive Arts & Sciences (AIAS), and were held at the Red Rock Casino, Resort & Spa in Las Vegas, Nevada on February 18, 2010. It was also held as part of the Academy's 2010 D.I.C.E. Summit, and was hosted by stand-up comedian Jay Mohr.

This was the first year that "Console Game of the Year" and "Computer Game of the Year" were not offered. "Handheld Game of the Year" and "Cellular Game of the Year" were merged into the "Portable Game of the Year" award category. Additionally, an award for "Outstanding Achievement in Portable Game Design" was offered. "Role-Playing Game of the Year" and "Massively Multiplayer Game of the Year" were merged into one category. "Social Network Game of the Year" was also offered.

Uncharted 2: Among Thieves received the most nominations and won the most awards, including "Game of the Year". Sony Computer Entertainment received the most nominations and won the most awards as a publisher, with Naughty Dog as the most nominated and award-winning developer. Electronic Arts had the most nominated and award-winning games.

Mark Cerny, known for Crash Bandicoot and Spyro, was inducted into the Academy of Interactive Arts & Sciences Hall of Fame. Doug Lowenstein, founder of the Entertainment Software Association (ESA), received the "Lifetime Achievement Award". David Crane, co-founder of Activision, was the recipient of the "Pioneer Award".

== Winners and Nominees ==
Winners are listed first, highlighted in boldface, and indicated with a double dagger (‡).

=== Game of the Year awards ===
**Game of the Year**: **Uncharted 2: Among Thieves** — **Naughty Dog**, **Sony Computer Entertainment**‡; Assassin's Creed II — Ubisoft Montreal; Batman: Arkham Asylum — Rocksteady Studios, Warner Bros. Interactive Entertainment; Call of Duty: Modern Warfare 2 — Infinity Ward, Activision; Dragon Age: Origins — BioWare, Electronic Arts
**Portable Game of the Year**: **Scribblenauts** — **5th Cell**, **Warner Bros. Interactive Entertainment**‡; LittleBigPlanet (Note: PlayStation Portable version) — SCE Studio Cambridge; Mario & Luigi: Bowser's Inside Story — AlphaDream, Nintendo; Professor Layton and the Diabolical Box — Level-5, Nintendo; The Legend of Zelda: Spirit Tracks — Nintendo EAD	**Outstanding Innovation in Gaming**: **Scribblenauts** — **5th Cell**, **Warner Bros. Interactive Entertainment**‡; Demon's Souls — FromSoftware, Atlus; FarmVille — Zynga; Flower — Thatgamecompany, Sony Computer Entertainment; Uncharted 2: Among Thieves — Naughty Dog, Sony Computer Entertainment

=== Craft awards ===
**Outstanding Achievement in Game Direction**: **Uncharted 2: Among Thieves** — **Naughty Dog**, **Sony Computer Entertainment**‡; Assassin's Creed II — Ubisoft Montreal; Batman: Arkham Asylum — Rocksteady Studios, Warner Bros. Interactive Entertainment; Brütal Legend — Double Fine Productions, Electronic Arts; Flower — Thatgamecompany, Sony Computer Entertainment	**Outstanding Achievement in Game Design**: **Batman: Arkham Asylum** — **Rocksteady Studios**, **Warner Bros. Interactive Entertainment**‡; Call of Duty: Modern Warfare 2 — Infinity Ward, Activision; Mario & Luigi: Bowser's Inside Story — AlphaDream, Nintendo; Plants vs. Zombies — PopCap Games; Uncharted 2: Among Thieves — Naughty Dog, Sony Computer Entertainment
**Outstanding Achievement in Portable Game Design**: **Scribblenauts** — **5th Cell**, **Warner Bros. Interactive Entertainment**‡; Henry Hatsworth in the Puzzling Adventure — EA Tiburon; LittleBigPlanet — SCE Studio Cambridge; LocoRoco 2 — SCE Japan Studio; Patapon 2 — SCE Japan Studio	**Outstanding Achievement in Online Gameplay**: **Call of Duty: Modern Warfare 2** — **Infinity Ward**, **Activision**‡; Borderlands — Gearbox Software, 2K Games; FarmVille — Zynga; Left 4 Dead 2 — Valve; Uncharted 2: Among Thieves — Naughty Dog, Sony Computer Entertainment
**Outstanding Achievement in Gameplay Engineering**: **Uncharted 2: Among Thieves** — **Naughty Dog**, **Sony Computer Entertainment**‡; Assassin's Creed II — Ubisoft Montreal; Forza Motorsport 3 — Turn 10 Studios, Microsoft Game Studios; Left 4 Dead 2 — Valve; New Super Mario Bros. Wii — Nintendo EAD	**Outstanding Achievement in Visual Engineering**: **Uncharted 2: Among Thieves** — **Naughty Dog**, **Sony Computer Entertainment**‡; Assassin's Creed II — Ubisoft Montreal; Call of Duty: Modern Warfare 2 — Infinity Ward, Activision; Killzone 2 — Guerrilla Games, Sony Computer Entertainment; Ratchet & Clank Future: A Crack in Time — Insomniac Games, Sony Computer Entertainment
**Outstanding Achievement in Animation**: **Uncharted 2: Among Thieves** — **Naughty Dog**, **Sony Computer Entertainment**‡; Assassin's Creed II — Ubisoft Montreal; Batman: Arkham Asylum — Rocksteady Studios, Warner Bros. Interactive Entertainment; Call of Duty: Modern Warfare 2 — Infinity Ward, Activision; Ratchet & Clank Future: A Crack in Time — Insomniac Games, Sony Computer Entertainment	**Outstanding Achievement in Art Direction**: **Uncharted 2: Among Thieves** — **Naughty Dog**, **Sony Computer Entertainment**‡; Assassin's Creed II — Ubisoft Montreal; Call of Duty: Modern Warfare 2 — Infinity Ward, Activision; Machinarium — Amanita Design; Resident Evil 5 — Capcom
**Outstanding Achievement in Character Performance**: **Mark Hamill as The Joker** **(Batman: Arkham Asylum)** — **Rocksteady Studios**, **Warner Bros. Interactive Entertainment**‡; Jack Black as Eddie Riggs (Brütal Legend) — Double Fine Productions, Electronic Arts; Karen Dyer as Sheva Alomar (Resident Evil 5) — Capcom; Claudia Black as Chloe Frazer (Uncharted 2: Among Thieves) — Naughty Dog, Sony Computer Entertainment; Nolan North as Nathan Drake (Uncharted 2: Among Thieves) — Naughty Dog, Sony Computer Entertainment	**Outstanding Achievement in Original Music Composition**: **Uncharted 2: Among Thieves** — **Naughty Dog**, **Sony Computer Entertainment**‡; Assassin's Creed II — Ubisoft Montreal; Batman: Arkham Asylum — Rocksteady Studios, Warner Bros. Interactive Entertainment; Call of Duty: Modern Warfare 2 — Infinity Ward, Activision; Flower — Thatgamecompany, Sony Computer Entertainment
**Outstanding Achievement in Soundtrack**: **Brütal Legend** — **Double Fine Productions**, **Electronic Arts**‡; DJ Hero — FreeStyleGames, Activision; Skate 2 — EA Black Box; The Beatles: Rock Band — Harmonix, MTV Games	**Outstanding Achievement in Sound Design**: **Uncharted 2: Among Thieves** — **Naughty Dog**, **Sony Computer Entertainment**‡; Assassin's Creed II — Ubisoft Montreal; Call of Duty: Modern Warfare 2 — Infinity Ward, Activision; Flower — Thatgamecompany, Sony Computer Entertainment; Skate 2 — EA Black Box
**Outstanding Achievement in Original Story**: **Uncharted 2: Among Thieves** — **Naughty Dog**, **Sony Computer Entertainment**‡; Assassin's Creed II — Ubisoft Montreal; Brütal Legend — Double Fine Productions, Electronic Arts; Professor Layton and the Diabolical Box — Level-5, Nintendo; Ratchet & Clank Future: A Crack in Time — Insomniac Games, Sony Computer Entertainment	**Outstanding Achievement in Adapted Story**: **Batman: Arkham Asylum** — **Rocksteady Studios**, **Warner Bros. Interactive Entertainment**‡; Ghostbusters: The Video Game — Terminal Reality, Atari, Inc.; Marvel Ultimate Alliance 2 — Vicarious Visions, Activision

=== Genre awards ===
**Action Game of the Year**: **Call of Duty: Modern Warfare 2** — **Infinity Ward**, **Activision**‡; Left 4 Dead 2 — Valve; Prototype — Radical Entertainment, Activision; Red Faction: Guerrilla — Volition, THQ; Shadow Complex — Chair Entertainment, Microsoft Game Studios	**Adventure Game of the Year**: **Uncharted 2: Among Thieves** — **Naughty Dog**, **Sony Computer Entertainment**‡; Assassin's Creed II — Ubisoft Montreal; Batman: Arkham Asylum — Rocksteady Studios, Warner Bros. Interactive Entertainment; New Super Mario Bros. Wii — Nintendo EAD; Ratchet & Clank Future: A Crack in Time — Insomniac Games, Sony Computer Entertainment
**Casual Game of the Year**: **Flower** — **Thatgamecompany**, **Sony Computer Entertainment**‡; Drawn: The Painted Tower — Big Fish Studios; Flight Control — Firemint; Plants vs. Zombies — PopCap Games; Scribblenauts — 5th Cell, Warner Bros. Interactive Entertainment	**Family Game of the Year**: **The Beatles: Rock Band** — **Harmonix**, **MTV Games**‡; Guitar Hero 5 — Neversoft, Activision; Lego Rock Band — Harmonix, TT Fusion, MTV Games, Warner Bros. Interactive Entertainment; Wii Fit Plus — Nintendo EAD; Wii Sports Resort — Nintendo EAD
**Fighting Game of the Year**: **Street Fighter IV** — **Dimps**, **Capcom**‡; Fight Night Round 4 — EA Canada; Punch-Out! — Next Level Games, Nintendo; Tekken 6 — Namco Bandai Games; UFC 2009 Undisputed — Yuke's, THQ	**Role-Playing/Massively Multiplayer Game of the Year**: **Dragon Age: Origins** — **BioWare**, **Electronic Arts**‡; Borderlands — Gearbox Software, 2K Games; Champions Online — Cryptic Studios, Atari, Inc.; Demon's Souls — FromSoftware, Atlus; Mario & Luigi: Bowser's Inside Story — AlphaDream, Nintendo
**Racing Game of the Year**: **Forza Motorsport 3** — **Turn 10 Studios**, **Microsoft Game Studios**‡; Colin McRae: Dirt 2 — Codemasters; Need for Speed: Shift — Slightly Mad Studios, Electronic Arts	**Social Networking Game of the Year**: **FarmVille** — **Zynga**‡; Bejeweled Blitz — PopCap Games, Electronic Arts; Farm Town — Codebell; Restaurant City — Playfish, Electronic Arts
**Sports Game of the Year**: **FIFA 10** — **EA Canada**‡; MLB 09: The Show — SCE San Diego; NBA 2K10 — Visual Concepts, 2K Games; NHL 10 — EA Canada; Tiger Woods PGA Tour 10 — EA Tiburon	**Strategy/Simulation Game of the Year**: **Brütal Legend** — **Double Fine Productions**, **Electronic Arts**‡; Fire Emblem: Shadow Dragon — Intelligent Systems, Nintendo; Halo Wars — Ensemble Studios, Microsoft Game Studios; The Sims 3 — Maxis, Electronic Arts; Warhammer 40,000: Dawn of War II — Relic Entertainment, THQ

=== Special awards ===
==== Hall of Fame ====
- Mark Cerny

==== Lifetime Achievement ====
- Douglas Lowenstein

==== Pioneer ====
- David Crane

=== Multiple nominations and awards ===
==== Multiple Nominations ====
Games that received multiple nominations
Nominations	Game
15	Uncharted 2: Among Thieves
10	Assassin's Creed II
9	Call of Duty: Modern Warfare 2
8	Batman: Arkham Asylum
5	Brütal Legend
5	Flower
4	Ratchet & Clank Future: A Crack in Time
4	Scribblenauts
3	FarmVille
3	Left 4 Dead 2
3	Mario & Luigi: Bowser's Inside Story
2	Borderlands
2	Demon's Souls
2	Dragon Age: Origins
2	Forza Motorsport 3
2	LittleBigPlanet
2	New Super Mario Bros. Wii
2	Plants vs. Zombies
2	Professor Layton and the Diabolical Box
2	Resident Evil 5
2	Skate 2
2	The Beatles: Rock Band

Nominations by company
Nominations	Games	Company
30	8	Sony Computer Entertainment
18	12	Electronic Arts
15	1	Naughty Dog
13	5	Activision
13	3	Warner Bros. Interactive Entertainment
12	8	Nintendo
10	1	Ubisoft
9	1	Infinity Ward
8	1	Rocksteady Studios
5	1	Double Fine Productions
5	1	Thatgamecompany
4	3	Microsoft Game Studios
4	1	5th Cell
4	1	Insomniac Games
3	3	THQ
3	2	2K Games
3	2	Capcom
3	2	Harmonix
3	2	MTV Games
3	2	PopCap Games
3	1	AlphaDream
3	1	Valve
3	1	Zynga
2	2	Atari, Inc.
2	1	Atlus
2	1	BioWare
2	1	FromSoftware
2	1	Gearbox Software
2	1	Level-5
2	1	Turn 10 Studios

==== Multiple awards ====
Games that received multiple awards
Awards	Game
10	Uncharted 2: Among Thieves
3	Batman: Arkham Asylum
3	Scribblenauts
2	Brütal Legend
2	Call of Duty: Modern Warfare 2

Awards by company
Awards	Games	Company
11	2	Sony Computer Entertainment
10	1	Naughty Dog
6	2	Warner Bros. Interactive Entertainment
4	3	Electronic Arts
3	1	5th Cell
3	1	Rocksteady Studios
2	1	Activision
2	1	Infinity Ward
