= Drawn to Life: Two Realms =

2020 video game

- North American Nintendo Switch cover art
- Developer: Digital Continue
- Publisher: 505 Games
- Programmers: Char George; Chris McGinnis
- Artists: Justine Raymond; Chow Chern Fai; Akio Segawa
- Composer: David J. Franco
- Series: Drawn to Life
- Platforms: iOS, Android, Switch, Windows
- Release: December 7, 2020
- Genres: Platform, puzzle
- Mode: Single-player

Drawn to Life: Two Realms is a puzzle-platform game developed by Digital Continue and published by 505 Games. The game is a sequel to 2009's Drawn to Life: The Next Chapter and was released on December 7, 2020.

== Gameplay ==
Drawn to Life: Two Realms is a 2D puzzle-platform game where the player draws their own hero to play as, similar to previous incarnations. Unlike previous games in the series, Two Realms uses isometric graphics for the villages outside of levels, and allows the player to explore the never-before-seen Human world.

New to the game is the addition of "toys" which can be placed directly into the level to help The Hero progress. This is analogous to the Action Drawing mechanic seen in Drawn to Life: The Next Chapter for Nintendo DS and Wii.

=== Village Mode ===
Unlike previous Drawn to Life games, Two Realms adopts a pixel-inspired isometric view of the village areas outside of levels. The village areas in both the Human and Raposa realms act as a general hub where the player can interact with the characters and progress the game.

=== Draw Mode ===
A new Creation Tool introduced in Drawn to Life: Two Realms expands the creative possibility with millions of colors, unique stickers, templates, and new hero animations. The player can unlock additional Stickers to further customize and save different looks for their Hero via the new "Outfit System".

In Two Realms, Draw Mode takes a major overhaul. Like previous installments, stamps, templates, and basic drawing tools are available (such as the fill bucket, eraser, and varying brush sizes), but new tools exist such as transparency locking (Alpha Lock) and a digital color-picker.

A basic color palette exists which allows the player to choose basic colors for their creations. The colors available on this basic palette are nearly identical to those available on the standard palette of Drawn to Life's Draw Mode, with the exclusion of one color.

== Plot ==
The game begins with Mari praying to the Creator and reminiscing on the events of the past two games; the Raposa realm is shown to still exist despite seemly disappearing at the end of the previous game. A hooded Raposa (later revealed to be a reformed Wilfre, who was revived) appears behind her. He gives her the Book of Imagination and tells her how different the human realm is from the Raposa realm. Mari thanks him for his help and goes to Creation Hall.

Inside Creation Hall, Mari prays to the Creator again and asks for a new Hero. After sending her a Hero, she asks how the Hero will fit in in the human realm. The Creator tells Mari that humans will see the Hero as one of them. The Hero is given the power to use the Book of Imagination to enter a person's mind and rid it of corruption through Imagination Battles, and travel between the two realms. Mari sends the Hero to find Mike in the town of Belleview. It is revealed that following the death of Mike and Heather's parents, the townspeople blamed each other for their deaths while Mike and Heather are sent to live with their uncle, and that Mike has blamed the whole thing on a police officer named Deputy Snyder, who was also involved in the accident that killed his parents. As the Hero enters people's minds to rid them of Shadows that are corrupting them, it learns that the Shadow's leader is Aldark, though only Mike and the Hero can see them. Mike eventually travels to the Raposa realm and meets Mari and Jowee.

When rifts begin to form between Mike and his friends, Aldark reveals that Mike's memories of the Raposa is what allows the Hero and Mike to travel between the realms, possibly explaining why the Raposa realm still exists. After having Imagination Battles with Mike, his close friend Aly, and Snyder to rid them of the Shadows influencing them, Aldark summons more Shadows, who are now visible to the townspeople, to attack Belleview. The Hero fights and defeats Aldark, though it is hinted that he will return. The Hero returns to the Raposa realm where Wilfre thanks them for dealing with the Shadows. The credits reveal what happened to the characters that the Hero interacted with. Afterwards, Jowee proposes to Mari and Mike forgives Snyder before telling Aly about the Hero.

== Development ==
In 2009, Jeremiah Slaczka joked in an IGN interview that a third game in the series, titled Drawn to Life: The New World, would be a launch title for the DS2.

Following THQ's bankruptcy in 2013, the rights to the Drawn to Life series were given to 505 Games. A mobile port of the original game for iOS was developed by WayForward and released a year later, in May 2014. This version was poorly received and was eventually delisted. The series remained dormant for six years until October 2020, when Drawn to Life: Two Realms was leaked on a Taiwanese rating site. One month later, 505 Games' French YouTube channel accidentally leaked the reveal trailer, which was quickly taken down. The game was released on December 7 the same year.

Two Realms was the third attempt at a Drawn to Life continuation and was pitched to 505 Games in 2019. Earlier revival attempts had been pitched in 2015 and 2017. Many of the original creators of the first two DS games made a return in Drawn to Life: Two Realms, including artists Chern Fai and Edison Yan, executive producer Joseph Tringali, and composer David J. Franco.

== Reception ==
Reception

Aggregate scores
Aggregator	Score
Metacritic	50/100
OpenCritic	18% recommend

Review score
Publication	Score
Nintendo Life	4/10

The game received "mixed or average reviews" according to video game review aggregator platform Metacritic. Fellow review aggregator OpenCritic assessed that the game received weak approval, being recommended by 18% of critics. Nintendo Life called it "a sequel that fails to replicate what made the Drawn To Life games so compelling", criticizing the gameplay mechanics and plot.

== Future ==
In a 2020 interview, Digital Continue founder Joseph Tringali stated that remakes of the previous games as well as a "larger and expansive sequel" would be considered depending on the sales and reception of the game.
