= Drawn to Life: The Next Chapter =

Drawn to Life: The Next Chapter may refer to:

- Drawn to Life: The Next Chapter (Nintendo DS video game)
- Drawn to Life: The Next Chapter (Wii video game)
