= Drawn to Life: SpongeBob SquarePants Edition =

2008 video game

- European box art
- Developer: Altron
- Publisher: THQ (Note: Published under the Play THQ label)
- Director: Shimpei Echigo
- Producer: Shimpei Echigo
- Programmers: Shimpei Echigo; Koji Yoshida; Yoshihiro Tanaka
- Artists: Tomoya Hiwatari; Keiko Miyazawa; Takehito Yamada; Katsuhiko Yamaguchi; Yoshinori Numoto; Yuhei Fujita
- Composer: Tomoyoshi Sato
- Series: Drawn to Life; SpongeBob SquarePants
- Platform: Nintendo DS
- Release: NA: September 15, 2008; AU: September 25, 2008; EU: September 26, 2008
- Genre: Action
- Modes: Single-player, multiplayer

Drawn to Life: SpongeBob SquarePants Edition is a video game for the Nintendo DS. It is a spin-off of 5th Cell's 2007 DS game Drawn to Life, and is based on the Nickelodeon animated comedy series SpongeBob SquarePants, specifically the episode "Frankendoodle". The game was developed by Altron and published by Play THQ, a former subsidiary of THQ. It was released in North America, Australia, and Europe in 2008.

== Plot ==
Similar to how the episode "Frankendoodle" begins, an artist at sea accidentally drops two pencils in the ocean while working on one of his artworks. One of the pencils lands on Patrick, and after a brief panic, remembers that it's a magic pencil that brings drawings to life. Patrick also remembers one drawing in particular that he's not allowed to draw, due to previous circumstances. This drawing turns out to be DoodleBob, where Patrick unknowingly draws him trying to remember what the forbidden drawing was.

DoodleBob comes to life and steals Patrick's pencil, running off to Downtown Bikini Bottom to cause havoc. After Patrick informs SpongeBob about DoodleBob's return, they both find the other pencil that fell from earlier, and decide to draw a hero to help stop DoodleBob. The player is then assigned to draw their own character who they will play as for the remainder of the game; SpongeBob and Patrick name the hero "DoodlePants". Soon after, an army of doodles summoned by DoodleBob arrives and kidnaps SpongeBob, prompting Patrick and the new hero DoodlePants to give chase.

After DoodlePants rescues SpongeBob, they arrive in Downtown Bikini Bottom, only to find it destroyed. It's there where they recruit Squidward, who claims to have had his clarinet stolen by the doodle army (Nicknamed "Doodle Dudes" in the game) and demands his house to be repaired. Eventually, they rescue Mr. Krabs, who reopens the Krusty Krab which was closed from his absence.

After chasing DoodleBob through the Jungle and Deep Sea, and saving citizens including Mrs. Puff, Pearl, and Sandy, while also defeating evil doodles such as a giant doodle robot and Doodle Pat (a drawn version of Patrick, who is more intelligent), DoodlePants and the others draw a rocket ship to pursue DoodleBob into Outer Space. DoodleBob had drawn a replica of Bikini Bottom on the Moon, for the supposed intent of confusion. They confront DoodleBob and after a fight, seemingly catch him, only for him to escape at the last second in a rocket ship of his own. DoodlePants chases him once again to another planet and defeats the giant DoodleBob with the magic pencil.

As Squidward decides to finish him off, SpongeBob objects with a realization that DoodleBob only created his own version of Bikini Bottom out of a desire for friends. SpongeBob decides to erase DoodleBob's menacing face and draw a more happy face, resulting in a more friendly DoodleBob. SpongeBob, Squidward, and Patrick take off back to Bikini Bottom on their rocket ship, leaving the now befriended DoodleBob and DoodlePants to live life in the doodle version of Bikini Bottom.

== Gameplay ==
Drawn to Life: SpongeBob SquarePants Edition is at its core a 2D platforming game, and one that is fairly similar to Drawn to Life. At the beginning of the game, the player draws a hero with the DS touchscreen to play as for the rest of the game. Throughout the game, the player is assigned to draw a variety of platforms and other objects that are required to beat the level, which are indicated when the player finds a blank easel within the level, or are sometimes assigned right away. The custom hero has basic maneuverability compared to most games. They are given the ability to jump, ground pound, and attack or "karate chop", similarly seen in the show. These moves are used to do things like break crates, push buttons, and attack enemies.

Along with the hero's basic moves, there are also the addition of power-ups, ranging from basic weapons to defend against enemies and bosses, or gear for getting through previously inaccessible areas. Just like the other objects that are drawn in this game, power-ups are drawn by the player as well. The hero is given a set number of hit points, which can be upgraded to a maximum of seven depending on how far the player is in the game. If all are lost, it will result in losing a life, and moving back to the last checkpoint they touched. If the player loses all their lives, they are sent back to the game's hub world.

The game also gives the player a partner system, where they are given the choice to tag along with SpongeBob, Patrick, or Squidward, each with their own special ability that benefits the hero. Once an ability is used once, it cannot be used again for several seconds. SpongeBob's ability generates a square shield for the hero, Patrick hurls himself forward and stuns enemies in a straight line, and Squidward stuns enemies around the hero by playing his clarinet in a certain radius. An icon in the top right of the screen is a visual indicator of the partner the player chose, which changes expressions depending on if enemies are close by, or if they're burned out from using their ability. Occasionally, levels feature crates with either SpongeBob, Patrick, or Squidward's face on it, which require their ability to break open.

Similar to Drawn to Life, inside each level are filled with black goo. Each location covered in goo is where enemies spawn, and it can be erased by rubbing the touch screen, as can the enemies once they're stunned. Unlike Drawn to Life, however, once the player erases an enemy, they have the ability to draw modified versions of enemies and turn them into friends or allies. The hidden three villagers in cages are also featured in this game as well, but rather than having to rescue all of them in order to beat the level, the player only needs to rescue at least one to earn a key to activate the victory display at the end of the level. The game features a few secrets in each level, which along with the rescues and goo, are required to one-hundred percent complete the level.

The game has a hub world that the player goes to once a level is cleared or lost. When the hero enters the hub world for the first time, they are commanded to draw their own house along with a bed to go inside, which is used to save the game. The inside of the house is fully customizable, where furniture drawn by the player can be placed anywhere inside the house. Furniture is acquired by talking to the villagers the player rescued in other levels. Other villagers that have been rescued have the player drawing houses and other amenities around the village. Certain pieces of furniture that are obtained unlock a hidden feature in the game, the record player unlocks the sound test, for example.

The Krusty Krab can also be found in the hub world, functioning as this game's shop. Gold collected in levels can be used to purchase power-ups that are stored away in the player's inventory, which can be taken out for later. The shop also features color palettes for the creation tool, and colorless templates of certain characters, as well as lessons on how to draw certain characters.

The main game consists of four worlds: Bikini Bottom, The Jungle, The Deep Sea, and Outer Space. At the end of each world are bosses that function differently from Drawn to Life's. After hitting them a few times, they become stunned and require the player to erase them by rubbing the touchscreen until their health reaches zero. There is an optional fifth world that is available once the main game is clear, called "Notebook Land". This world only consists of two levels; one level is one of the longest and most difficult levels in the game, and the other is a boss fight with Doodle Squidward, which shares the same appearance as the drawing of Squidward Patrick had drawn in "Frankendoodle".

The game features over 20 different levels, and reportedly contains a hidden 2-player versus mode, although a few evidences of this mode in action is shown in other media, due to its obscurity. The game's main menu also has a "Cheat Entry" where the player can input hidden cheat codes. Most of the other cheat codes don't benefit the player all that substantially, and just unlock certain drawings on the title screen, but one cheat code grants the player the maximum amount of gold obtainable in the game, and another cheat code performs a soft reset.

== Development ==
Following the success of Drawn to Life, THQ reportedly began pressuring 5th Cell to make a licensed title as their second DS game, claiming another original game would be too risky for such a new studio. 5th Cell refused and instead started work on what eventually became Lock's Quest.

Drawn to Life: SpongeBob SquarePants Edition was developed by Altron, a studio that had already worked with THQ on several SpongeBob SquarePants games, with little to no involvement from 5th Cell.

== Reception ==
Reception

Aggregate score
Aggregator	Score
Metacritic	68/100

Review scores
Publication	Score
1Up.com	C−
GamePro	3.5/5
GameZone	7/10
IGN	7.5/10
NGamer	78%
Nintendo Power	7/10
Official Nintendo Magazine	51%
VideoGamer.com	8/10

The game received "average" reviews according to video game review aggregator platform Metacritic.
