= Hybrid (video game) =

2012 video game

- Developer: 5th Cell
- Publisher: Microsoft Studios
- Designer: Jeremiah Slaczka
- Composers: David J. Franco; Tracy W. Bush
- Engine: Source
- Platform: Xbox 360
- Release: August 8, 2012
- Genre: Third-person shooter
- Mode: Multiplayer

Hybrid is a downloadable third-person shooter video game released on August 8, 2012, for the Xbox 360 through Xbox Live Arcade. It was developed by Bellevue, Washington-based 5th Cell. Utilizing the Source game engine from Valve, it is the first Xbox 360 title from 5th Cell.

== Plot ==
In 2032, a catastrophic accident has obliterated Australia and sent the world into turmoil. An alien race called the Variants compete with the surviving humans, called the Paladins, to collect a powerful substance known as dark matter.

== Gameplay ==
Players choose between the Variant faction and the Paladin faction when they begin playing. The five included continents (Australia having been obliterated and Antarctica excluded) have been broken up into sections in which the two factions compete for dark matter. By playing in a section, a player increases their faction's percentage in that section. When a faction reaches 100% in a section first, that faction will get two pieces of dark matter. If the other faction reaches 100% in that section after that, they will receive 1 piece of dark matter. The two factions race to collect 200 pieces of dark matter before the other.

Hybrid is a third-person shooter game heavily focused on a cover system. Players use a jetpack to move from cover to cover, and can move around a cover when they reach one. A variety of weapons are available, which are tailored to different play styles. By killing multiple enemies in a row, players can unlock drones to help the player out. Different game modes are available, with differing winning conditions and objectives for each. Players level up as they play and can unlock new guns and equipment.

== Development ==
Hybrid was hinted at for many months before its official announcement. The unnamed XBLA title from 5th Cell was talked about for nearly a year before any real information was released, other than that it was going to be "pretty big".

On October 21, 2010, a mysterious 7-day countdown appeared on the 5th Cell website featuring an ashy ground with footprints and a clearly imprinted logo, causing speculation among the gaming community at the seemingly uncharacteristic theme.

At the close of the countdown, on Friday, October 29, at 1:00am EST/PDT an exclusive debut teaser trailer was shown on GameTrailers, revealing that the game would be a third-person shooter. At that time, 5th Cell also launched the official Hybrid website, displaying two dog tags linking to two different hubs of information about the game as relayed by the opposing factions.

== Reception ==
Reception

Aggregate score
Aggregator	Score
Metacritic	73/100

Review scores
Publication	Score
Destructoid	8/10
Eurogamer	7/10
Game Informer	6/10
GameRevolution	7/10
GameSpot	8/10
GamesRadar+	4/5
Giant Bomb	4/5
IGN	8/10
VentureBeat	76/100

Hybrid received "mixed or average" reviews, according to review aggregator Metacritic.
