= Drawn to Life: The Next Chapter (Nintendo DS video game) =

2009 Nintendo DS video game

- Worldwide box art
- Developer: 5th Cell
- Publisher: THQ
- Director: Jeremiah Slaczka
- Designers: Matt Pellicane; Jeremiah Slaczka
- Programmer: Brian D. Firfer
- Artists: Edison Yan; Paul Robertson; David Hellman; Chow Chern Fai
- Writer: Jeremiah Slaczka
- Composer: David J. Franco
- Series: Drawn to Life
- Platform: Nintendo DS
- Release: AU: October 8, 2009; EU: October 16, 2009; NA: October 27, 2009
- Genres: Action-adventure, platform
- Modes: Single-player, multiplayer

Drawn to Life: The Next Chapter is a 2D platform video game developed by 5th Cell and published by THQ for the Nintendo DS, released in October 2009 in all regions except Japan. It is a sequel to the original Drawn to Life and a counterpart to the Wii version, although it has a different plot. One of the game's major features is the player's ability to draw elements of the game, and the game has a heavy emphasis on doing so.

== Gameplay ==
The player creating their hero, using the Creation Hall

Drawn to Life: The Next Chapter is a 2D platforming game in which the player draws their own protagonist to play as, as well as many of the game's in-game elements. The protagonist is able to play as three different forms - humanoid, blob and spider - each having their own perks; humanoid form having access to weapons, blob form being able to fit through small gaps and spider form being able to shoot webs and climb walls. These forms are unlocked through progression in the game. The humanoid hero can choose from three weapon classes - slasher, shooter and slinger - and is able to upgrade each at any time from a store using coins, collected in each stage. Both forms and weapons can be freely swapped at any time. The player must use these form and weapon abilities to pass each stage.

The player must reach the end of each stage to gain the giant color drop bottle. This grants the Hero color drops in which the hero can restore color to the various hub worlds to both progress in the game and access optional stages. The player is also able to collect coins in order to purchase items from an in-game vendor, such as weapon upgrades and music. As well as coins and color drops, the player is able to collect 'Bakibeard's Tokens', in which, if all are collected, the player gains 'Bakibeard's treasure'. Additionally, in some stages, there is a lost Raposa. Finding them will restore them back to the village. Some stages have 'Action Draw sections', in which the player (taking the role of 'The Creator') must draw a path for the Hero that the Hero would not normally be able to cross. The player must use a limited number of lines to draw a crossable path for the Hero.

The game has five main areas: the Village, a large village on a turtle's back summoned by The Creator to act as a base for the Raposa; Watersong, a seaside city notable for its connections with music and singing; Lavasteam, a mining village situated on a volcano under the rule of King Miney; Galactic Jungle, a futuristic space world; and Wilfre's Wasteland, an area created by the antagonist Wilfre. Each stage is themed around the area it is housed in.

The game has a heavy emphasis on drawing. Most items, stage elements, world elements, weapons and hero forms must be drawn using the Nintendo DS stylus and touchscreen. Each drawing can be edited at any time at the 'Creation Hall'. A lot of drawing opportunities can be skipped by using an in-game template, but world elements such as the seabird and the lighthouse must be drawn. Players could also swap their drawings using a Nintendo Wi-Fi Connection before the service was discontinued in 2014.

== Plot ==
The game begins with a surreal sequence, wherein an unknown party asks the player: "What do you remember about that day?" The player is given several dialogue choices that build a cohesive description of "that day", though at this time, the player is not aware of the event's importance. Before the game begins, the player is asked to draw an image depicting this mysterious scene, introducing them to the game's core drawing mechanics.

Following this is an animation sequence wherein one of the characters from the previous game, Heather, recovers from a nightmare. She is shown to possess a red-colored jewel pendant. In the same sequence, Heather is abducted by a darkness which emanated from a scepter she discovered in a beached treasure chest in the middle of the night. The next morning, when the other characters realize she's missing, a search for her is cut short by a still-alive Wilfre, who causes the majority of the Raposa villagers to vanish, reveals himself as Heather's captor, and ultimately drains the Village of color. The remaining characters flee to the back of a massive turtle delivered, upon request, by the Creator.

Their numbers reduced and their home ruined, the game follows the Raposa's struggle to reunite with their fellows and, with the aid of the Creator's Hero of Creation, defeat Wilfre before he can realize his as-yet unknown goals. The remaining members of the Village travel to Watersong, Lavasteam, the Galactic Jungle, and Wilfre's Wasteland. At one point, Wilfre sways Mari into helping him, but she soon deflects back to the Hero's side. During the last level of Wilfre's Wasteland, Wilfre kills the Hero and starts absorbing color from it, supposedly destroying it. The villagers from the Turtle Ship, Watersong, Lavasteam, and Galactic Jungle all pray for the Hero to revive. The Hero revives but Wilfre returns with the creation that Mari built. The Hero defeats Wilfre, who vanishes, leaving Heather behind.

The Hero returns with Heather, who is now without her "dark side". At the word of Mari, the Creator puts out the Eternal Flame. All the Raposa disappear, with the exception of the non-Raposa Mike. The screen turns black to white. The same description of "that night" is displayed. Heather, who is actually a human and Mike's older sister, prays for her little brother: "God, just bring back my little brother to me". During the ending credits, a series of still photos of the events of "that night" are shown, which depict Heather, Mike, and their parents going home from a carnival, and eventually being involved in a car crash (although in this game the fates of the parents are left ambiguous as to whether or not they survive, the game's sequel confirms that they died). Heather sustains minor injuries, and her brother Mike goes into a coma; it is revealed that the Raposa world is a dream in Mike's mind and Wilfre was trying to keep Mike in his comatose state to ensure that the world stays in existence. In a hospital, Heather prays hoping that her brother will wake up. Later, Mike wakes up from his coma, and Heather hugs him out of joy. The final photo shows doll versions of Jowee and Mari that were won at the carnival.

An alternate ending is present in the Drawn to Life Collection (possibly due to the original being considered "too dark"). It depicts Heather and Mike catching fireflies while on a camping trip with their parents. During this, Mike climbs a tree and falls, knocking him unconscious. Heather holds his body and cries for help, resulting in her parents running over. Heather and her mother pray for Mike, and he regains consciousness soon after. It ends with the same shot of the Mari and Jowee dolls as the first ending.

== Development ==
Drawn to Life: The Next Chapter was developed at the same time as Scribblenauts, with about half of 5th Cell's team split between the two titles. The ending of the game was inspired by the tv show, The Odyssey, which similarly features a kid imagining a fantasy world while in a coma.

5th Cell had little to no involvement with the alternate ending included in the Drawn to Life Collection, as it was mainly handled by THQ. Jeremiah Slaczka claims not to know why the change was requested, as the ESRB had already rated and approved the game for release. The alternate ending is not considered canon.

Although initially described as a sequel to the Wii version, that game was later confirmed to be non-canonical, making this the second game in the series, followed by Drawn to Life: Two Realms.

== Reception ==
Reception

Aggregate score
Aggregator	Score
Metacritic	72/100

Review scores
Publication	Score
GameTrailers	6.7/10
GameZone	7.9/10
IGN	6.7/10
Nintendo Life	5/10
Nintendo Power	8/10

The game received "mixed or average reviews" according to video game review aggregator platform Metacritic.
