= Drawn to Life =

2007 platform video game

- North American box art
- Developer: 5th Cell (Note: iOS version developed by WayForward)
- Publishers: WW: THQ (Note: iOS version published by 505 Games); JP: Agatsuma Entertainment
- Directors: Jeremiah Slaczka (DS); Jeff Luke (iOS)
- Designers: Jeremiah Slaczka; Jeff Luke; James Youngman; Joseph M. Tringali
- Programmers: Brian D. Firfer (DS); Nate Trost (iOS)
- Artists: Chow Chern Fai; Jeremiah Slaczka
- Writer: Jeremiah Slaczka
- Composer: David J. Franco
- Series: Drawn to Life
- Platforms: Nintendo DS iOS
- Release: Nintendo DS: NA: September 10, 2007; AU: September 20, 2007; EU: September 21, 2007; KOR: January 15, 2008; JP: December 4, 2008; iOS: WW: May 21, 2014
- Genres: Action-adventure, platform
- Modes: Single-player, multiplayer

Drawn to Life is an action-adventure platform video game for the Nintendo DS developed by 5th Cell and published by THQ in 2007. It was later published by Agatsuma Entertainment in Japan in 2008 under the name Drawn to Life: God's Marionette (ドローン トゥ ライフ 〜神様のマリオネット〜, Dorōn tu Raifu: 〜Kami-sama no Marionetto〜), and in Korea under the title Geuryeora, Touch! Naega Mandeuneun Sesang. In the game, the player creates their own playable characters, level objects, and accessories by drawing them using the DS's stylus and touchscreen. The game was ported to iOS by WayForward and released by 505 Games in May 2014.

Drawn to Life requires the player to create a hero in order to free a cursed village from an encroaching darkness. It features numerous platforming levels, a top-down central village, and other elements such as vehicles, weapons, and platforms, which are drawn or colored by the player using the stylus.

Two sequels followed, both under the title Drawn to Life: The Next Chapter – one released for the DS, and another for the Wii. A spin-off title, Drawn to Life: SpongeBob SquarePants Edition (based on the SpongeBob SquarePants episode "Frankendoodle"), was developed by Altron for the DS. A third installment in the series, titled Drawn to Life: Two Realms, developed by Digital Continue and published by 505 Games, was released in December 2020, for Nintendo Switch, iOS, Android, and Microsoft Windows.

== Gameplay ==
Drawn to Life is a 2D game where the player must draw their own character, weapons and accessories, platforms, and objects. The game is separated into three different modes:

Village Mode is a top-down, central hub where the player progresses the story and interacts with the Raposa, purchases items from the item shop using rapo-coins collected in Adventure Mode, and accesses levels. Players draw different items at the Raposa's request to enrich their village. Over the course of the game in Village Mode, the player plays minigames, participate in a town festival, hunt for a thief, and help the Raposa thrive. Here players are given their objective for the next Adventure Mode level.

Screenshot

There are three main buildings in this mode. In Creation Hall, the players can edit their previous creations, and the item shop, where players can purchase songs, patterns, stamps, and even new abilities for their hero. Also, there is a wishing well in which players can dump rapo-coins to get prizes. The 10,000 rapo-coin grand prize is Developer's Grove, where the Hero can meet sprites of the game's developers.

Adventure Mode is a side-scrolling platformer with 16 levels. Here, the player battles enemies, rescues Raposa, and collects items. Players draw platforms that allow them to progress through the level. The levels exist in one of four different worlds: Ice, Forest, Tropical, and City, each with its own boss.

Players are tasked with rescuing three Raposa and four pieces of a page from the Book of Life, which has to be used to create a new village object. Players can also collect secret orbs that will then unlock and be purchasable in the item shop. In each section of the levels, players tap on an easel icon to enable Draw Mode, which tells the player to draw a new type of platform or object. Once drawn, the player goes back to Adventure Mode and can then interact with the newly drawn object.

Draw Mode is the tool through which players create new objects, weapons, and their hero. This is done through the stylus and touchscreen. Once drawn, objects and the hero will animate. The player can design up to three different humanoid heroes using a variety of colors, patterns, and stamps. Character creation also features 15 pre-made character templates which can be traced, or have their body parts used for those who are less artistic. The game's title screen can be drawn and saved, so players can make their own title screen.

Players can trade their drawn heroes and other objects via local Wi-Fi only.

== Plot ==
The main "race" of creatures inhabiting the universe of Drawn to Life are anthropomorphic fox-like beings known as the "Raposa" (raposa meaning "fox" in Portuguese). They were drawn by the Creator, who also drew their world and everything upon it using the Book of Life, but is believed to have abandoned the Raposa long ago.

The story begins with a Raposa named Mari crying out to the player, the Creator, to help save the village she lives in. Along the way, the player meets her best friend, Jowee, and her father, the Mayor. These characters are the last remaining villagers. The player designs a hero for them, and then runs into Wilfre, a corrupted Raposa that dabbled in creation, and spawned a legion of evil shadow-like creatures. The player starts by rescuing the Mayor, who sets off to bring back the Raposa to the village. As the player progresses, the player learns that Wilfre was once a prominent member of the Village, and that in his lust for power, he stole the Book of Life and tore the pages from it before fleeing the village, but not before the Mayor reclaimed the Book of Life from him. Wilfre's actions led the Creator to abandon the Raposa. The Mayor asks the hero to find and return the pages of the Book of Life, so the Creator can once again draw the missing objects from the Village.

The player starts by designing the Eternal Flame, which is then used to clear the darkness from each section of the village each time the player returns from completing a level. Along the way, the player rescues a cast of villagers, who agree to return to the village and open up shops, restaurants, and other places of interest. Among them are Heather, a strange female Raposa who is half-dark, and Mike, who is actually a human boy. Mari begins training to take over as Mayor, and the village plans a festival to celebrate. Meanwhile, adventure-hungry Jowee sneaks into a level, and the player has to save him and help find an appropriate gift for Mari. This reckless act causes a rift between Jowee and Mari, but they eventually make up and grow closer as they help the hero restore the village to what it once was.

After numerous confrontations with Wilfre, who awakens large monsters to attack the hero, he finally tricks the Mayor into appearing alone and attacks him, stealing the Book of Life as well. Everyone tries to help the Mayor, but a Raposa named Dr. Cure says she can do nothing for him. Everyone is devastated, but after seeing the Village's creations are vanishing, they decide to band together and stop Wilfre for good. The hero defeats Wilfre, takes back the Book of Life, and returns to the village. Jowee plans to leave on a treasure hunt, and after saying goodbye, Mari reminisces about the past, upset about losing her father and best friend. The story ends with Mari on the beach, shocked at seeing Jowee walk up behind her. She runs to him happily, watched over by the spirit of the Mayor and the hero on the cliff above.

== Soundtrack ==
Drawn to Life has over 40 songs which can be purchased in the game's item shop using rapo-coins. The game also includes a full vocal track for the ending, named "The End", composed by David J. Franco (the game's music and sound designer), and sung by Hayley Chipman and David J. Franco.

== Development ==
After developing several Java phone titles, 5TH Cell wanted to move to console development and began work on a game for the PlayStation Portable. The title was eventually canceled in favor of switching to the Nintendo DS, as the system was cheaper to develop for. After applying for a development kit, Nintendo never responded. Still interested in the idea, technical director Marius Fahlbusch reverse engineered a DS into a makeshift development kit, and along with co-founders Joseph M. Tringali, and Jeremiah Slaczka, created a demo of Drawn to Life in three months. When Nintendo received the demo, they gave 5th Cell a development kit, impressed by the concept of the game and the team’s persistence.

After receiving their development kit, 5th Cell began submitting their demo to online news sites in hopes of attracting the attention of potential publishers. Unfortunately, while articles about the game generated reader interest, they did not attract any publishers. One night on MSN Messenger, a business associate asked Slaczka about the game. After seeing the demo, he was impressed and connected Slaczka with THQ. In August 2006, Tim Campbell, THQ’s vice president of business development, gave 5th Cell its first contract, and THQ officially signed on as the publisher of Drawn to Life.

Drawn to Life was developed from August 2006 to Fall 2007. Nineteen additional employees were hired for the full game compared to the demo.

== Reception ==
=== Critical reviews ===
Reception

Aggregate score
Aggregator	Score	
Aggregator	DS	iOS
Metacritic	73/100	53/100

Review scores
Publication	Score	
Publication	DS	iOS
Eurogamer	6/10	N/A
Famitsu	31/40	N/A
Game Informer	7/10	N/A
GamePro	4.5/5	N/A
GameRevolution	B	N/A
GameSpot	7.5/10	N/A
GameSpy	3.5/5	N/A
GameZone	7.5/10	N/A
IGN	7.9/10	N/A
Nintendo Power	7.5/10	N/A
TouchArcade	N/A	3/5

The game received "mixed or average reviews" on both platforms according to video game review aggregator platform Metacritic. In Japan, Famitsu gave the DS version a score of three eights and one seven for a total of 31 out of 40.

=== Awards ===
Nintendo DS version of Drawn to Life was nominated for Outstanding Achievement in Story Development and Handheld Game of the Year at the 11th Annual Interactive Achievement Awards during the D.I.C.E. Summit. At IGN's "Best of 2007" awards, the DS version won Most Innovative Design and was a runner-up for Best Platform Game.

In GameSpot's Best of 2007, the DS version was nominated for Genre Awards' Best Platformer (All Systems) and Special Achievement's Best Original Game Mechanic. Nintendo Power nominated the game for Best Platformer (Wii & DS) for its 2007 Nintendo Power Awards. The DS version was also a finalist in the Second Annual Independent Games Festival: Mobile awards for Achievement in Art and Audio Achievement. In the 2007 NAVGTR awards, Drawn to Life won the award for Innovation in Gameplay.

=== Sales ===
From the game's launch in September 2007 until March 1, 2008, the game had sold 820,000 units for the North American and Western European territories and was ranked 61st of the top 100 selling video games of the last 12 months.

In THQ's 2007 holiday quarter sales conference call with investors, THQ President and CEO Brian Farrell said the publisher was pleased with the performance of the franchise and that the game had sold "several hundred thousand units worldwide [for the holiday season]". Adding that, over THQ's past three fiscal quarters, its DS sales had risen by 94%, primarily driven by Drawn to Life.

The game was well received in Australia, making its debut on the Top 10 Australian sales chart (GfK) for all platforms at #3, behind Halo 3 and The Legend of Zelda: Phantom Hourglass. It continued to stay on the Top 10 sales chart over the next two months until Christmas.

== Sequels, spin-off, and possible future ==
=== Drawn to Life: SpongeBob SquarePants Edition ===
A spin-off title was released in September 2008 for the Nintendo DS titled Drawn to Life: SpongeBob SquarePants Edition. The game is based on an episode from the Nickelodeon TV show SpongeBob SquarePants titled "Frankendoodle". This game was not developed by the original developer 5th Cell, but by Japanese developer Altron.

=== Drawn to Life: The Next Chapter ===
A Wii version of the game was developed by Planet Moon Studios, and was released in October 2009, concurrently with the DS version developed by 5th Cell. Drawn to Life: The Next Chapter, both for the Wii and Nintendo DS, introduces new gameplay mechanics such as the hero's ability to transform into different objects. The Wii version details the hero collecting Artifacts to defeat an evil shadow that has taken over the Raposa Village while the DS version details Wilfre's return.

=== Drawn to Life: Two Realms ===
After THQ filed for bankruptcy in 2013, the publishing rights to the series were acquired by 505 Games. A new installment, titled Drawn to Life: Two Realms, was developed by Digital Continue, published by 505 Games and was released on December 7, 2020, for Nintendo Switch, iOS, Android, and Microsoft Windows.

=== Future ===
Digital Continue founder Joseph Tringali stated in a 2020 interview that remakes of the previous games as well a "bigger sequel" were both things that he and other developers of the games would "love to take on", but also said that any future plans for the series depends on the reception of Drawn to Life: Two Realms.
