= Jeremiah Slaczka =

Video game developer

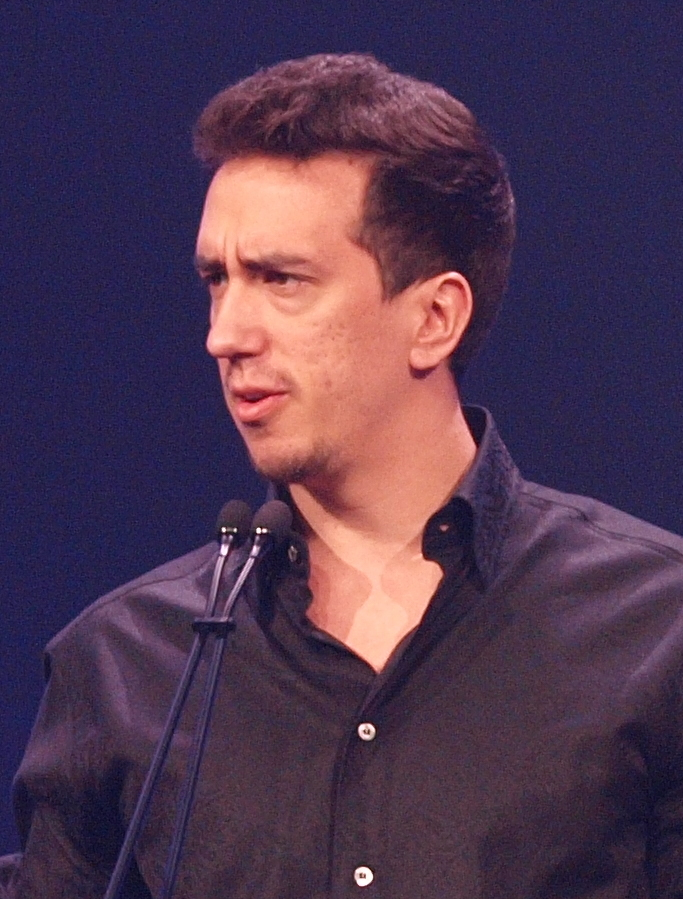
- Slaczka at the Game Developers Conference in 2010
- Other name: Miah
- Occupations: Creative director, Game designer
- Years active: 2000–present
- Employer: 5th Cell
- Children: 2

Jeremiah D Slaczka, also known by his nickname Miah, is an American video game designer/creative director and co-founder of 5th Cell, a video game developer in Bellevue, Washington. He is best known for being the concept creator and director of Scribblenauts as well as the million-seller hit video game Drawn to Life and 5th Cell's critically acclaimed Lock's Quest, all for the Nintendo DS. Slaczka is credited as the director, lead designer, story writer, original concept creator, and art director for both Drawn to Life and Lock's Quest.

Scribblenauts was the first handheld game ever to win a "Best of Show Overall" award (across all platforms) at E3 from IGN, GameSpot and GameSpy.

Drawn to Life has since gone on to spawn a franchise involving two sequels, accompanied by a Wii console version, all three titles published by THQ. His previous works for 5th Cell were in mobile games, using both original and licensed work.

In 2000, Slaczka, along with Joseph M. Tringali (co-founder and General Manager of 5th Cell), co-founded Epix Interactive Studios, a video game developer, in Chicago, Illinois, that was developing Fate, the first announced MMORPG for Microsoft's original Xbox. The project was canceled and the studio shut down in late 2001.

Slaczka has a wife named Kaori Slaczka and two daughters.

== Works ==
Credited as Director and/or Lead Designer

- Mini Poccha (2003) (Mobile): THQ - Additionally credited as: Art Director, Original Concept Creator
- Siege (2003) (Mobile): THQ - Additionally credited as: Art Director, Original Concept Creator
- SEAL Team 6 (2003) (Mobile): THQ - Additionally credited as: Art Director, Original Concept Creator
- Moto GP Manager (2006) (Mobile): THQ
- Full Spectrum Warrior: Mobile (2006) (Mobile): THQ
- D.N.A (2006) (PC): Merscom - Additionally credited as: Art Director, Original Concept Creator
- Drawn to Life (2007) (Nintendo DS): THQ - Additionally credited as: Original Story, Art Director, Original Concept Creator
- Lock's Quest (2008) (Nintendo DS): THQ - Additionally credited as: Original Story, Art Director, Original Concept Creator
- Drawn to Life: The Next Chapter (2009) (Nintendo DS): THQ - Additionally credited as: Written by and Original Concept Creator
- Scribblenauts (2009) (Nintendo DS): Warner Bros. Interactive Entertainment - Additionally credited as: Original Concept Creator
- Super Scribblenauts (2010) (Nintendo DS): Warner Bros. Interactive Entertainment - Additionally credited as: Original Concept Creator
- Run Roo Run (2012) (iOS): 5th Cell - Additionally credited as: Designed By
- Hybrid (2012) (XBLA): 5th Cell
- Scribblenauts Unlimited (2012) (Wii U, 3DS, PC): 5th Cell
- Scribblenauts Unmasked: A DC Comics Adventure (2013) (Wii U, 3DS, PC): Warner Bros. Interactive Entertainment, 5th Cell

== Awards ==
- Edge Magazine's Hottest 100 Game Developers of 2008 listed Jeremiah as 90
- Gamasutra's 20 'Breakthrough' Developers of 2008 - 5th Cell, Key person
