= Lock's Quest =

2008 video game

- Developers: 5th Cell; Digital Continue (remaster)
- Publishers: THQ; THQ Nordic (remaster)
- Director: Jeremiah Slaczka
- Designer: Jeremiah Slaczka
- Composers: David J. Franco
Released on
Platforms	Nintendo DS; Microsoft Windows; macOS; Linux; PlayStation 4; Xbox One
Release	Nintendo DS: NA: September 9, 2008; AU: September 25, 2008; EU: September 26, 2008; JP: February 19, 2009; Microsoft Windows, PlayStation 4, Xbox One: WW: May 30, 2017; Apple iOS, Android: WW: September 5, 2019
- Genres: Real-time strategy, tower defense
- Modes: Single-player, multiplayer

Lock's Quest is a 2008 real-time strategy tower defense video game developed by 5th Cell and published by THQ for the Nintendo DS. It is 5th Cell's second Nintendo DS game. Players control Lock, a young man forced to help defend the kingdom of Antonia from an invasion of clockwork soldiers. The gameplay revolves around constructing defences such as walls and turrets on isometric battle maps, then controlling Lock to fight alongside and maintain his defences.

The game was positively received upon its original release in 2008, with critics particularly praising the plot, gameplay and graphics. Criticism was also made of the controls, both in building defences and controlling Lock on the battlefield. In 2017, a remaster of Lock's Quest was released for PC, PlayStation 4 and Xbox One, and in 2019 was ported to iOS and Android mobile phones.

== Gameplay ==
Screenshot of the Nintendo DS version of the game. Players monitor the map and timer on the top screen, and control Lock with touch controls on the lower screen.

Lock's Quest is a real-time strategy game, incorporating tower defense gameplay elements. The battlefield, viewed from an isometric perspective, is displayed on the DS's lower screen. The upper screen shows an overall map with locations of defences and enemies, as well as the remaining time in the battle.

Combat is divided into two phases, Build and Battle. During the Build phase, the player has a limited amount of time and resources to construct defences, which consist of walls, towers, cannons, machines, and traps. Gates also allow Lock to move through defensive walls. Constructing defences consumes Source, which Lock can regain by defeating enemies.

The Battle phase follows the Build phase, and involves fighting waves of enemies while maintaining defences. Lock is able to attack enemies, and perform quick time events to deal additional damage. The player can also use Lock to repair damage done to defences, which requires another quick time event called "ratcheting". The objective for most levels is to protect a particular individual or object. Enemies spawn in zones on the edge of the map and travel towards the target, attacking defences in their way. On some levels, special "boss" enemies appear that must be defeated to end the battle.

Siege mode is an optional minigame which allows players to gain bonus Source for the main levels. This minigame is a 2D side-scrolling tower defense game.

In addition to the main campaign, a multiplayer mode exists where players build defences as normal on separate maps, but also control what enemies are sent against the other player.

== Plot ==
The game is set in the kingdom of Antonia, built using a mysterious substance known as Source. The builders of this kingdom, the Archineers, studied source in an attempt to better understand its properties. The greatest archineer was Agonius, who discovered a remarkable property of Source - that it can emulate life. Agonius started creating lifelike beings from the source, but the King, who understood the dangers of this, demanded that Agonius halt his work. Agonius refused, and so was banished from the kingdom.

Seeking vengeance upon the King, Agonius assumed the mantle of Lord Agony and created a clockwork army with the intent of destroying the kingdom. A war ensued, with heavy casualties on both sides. Eventually, two kingdom archineers, Kenan and Jacob, infiltrated Agony's fortress. The exact nature of the events that happened therein are not revealed until the end of the game - all that is known, at first, is that Agony was defeated, and Jacob was missing, presumed dead. Kenan, now a hero, took up the position of Chief Archineer.

The game itself begins some years after the events above. Lock is a young man living in the coastal village of Seacrest, along with his sister, Emi, and grandfather, Tobias. When the village (and entire kingdom) are attacked by a new army of clockworks, under a new Lord Agony, Lock enlists as an archineer and helps to fight the clockworks. After a 75-day campaign, the Kingdom force prevails and the new Agony is defeated. At the climax of the plot, it is revealed that the new Lord Agony is in fact Jacob. Long ago, when Jacob reached Agonius' chamber, he found Agonius a frail and broken man. He also found the young Lock, who was himself clockwork, the greatest creation of Agonius. Jacob took Lock and raised him as a human, under the guise of Tobias. He created Emi, who is also clockwork, and the village in which Lock was raised.

At the end of the game, the King tells Lock that, despite being clockwork, he was truly alive, because Agonius had given Lock his soul. As Emi lacked a human soul, she would eventually die. The final scene of the game is Lock and Emi playing tag on the beach.

== Development ==
THQ revealed the development of a tower defence game with the working title Construction Combat: Lock's Quest in April 2008 in a press release. In July, at San Diego Comic-Con, THQ debuted a promotional mini-comic based on the universe of the game entitled Lock's Quest: A Source of Hope - Volume 1 drawn by Edison Yan. IGN awarded Lock's Quest its "Best Strategy Game" award for the Nintendo DS at E3 2008 in July.

As promotion for the game's release, 5th Cell held a competition to win a custom DS Lite on their website. A similar competition was held by THQ Australia in October. Lock's Quest was released on September 9, 2008 in North America, with subsequent releases worldwide.

== Reception ==
Reception

Aggregate scores
Aggregator	Score
GameRankings	83%
Metacritic	80%

Review scores
Publication	Score
Destructoid	9/10
Eurogamer	7/10
GameSpot	8/10
GameSpy	4/5
GamesRadar+	4/5
GameZone	9/10
IGN	8.6/10
Nintendo Power	7/10
Nintendo World Report	7/10
Pocket Gamer	3.5/5

Lock's Quest was well-received by most critics. IGN praised most aspects of the game, and said that it was "one of the most original, inspired, and entertaining experiences" they played for DS, receiving an Editors' Choice Award and DS Game of the Month for September 2008. Nintendo World Report said Lock's Quest was "just a few design tweaks away from being a fantastic game", claiming that it is "definitely disappointing in light of all its great assets and originality". GameZone called it "unique" and "perfectly suited for the DS". GameDaily praised the story, gameplay, graphics and music, and called it "an excellent game". GameSpot enjoyed the "lengthy" single-player campaign, "exciting" multiplayer, and "addictive" gameplay. Eurogamer criticized the battle phase of combat and the enemy artificial intelligence, while praising the "excellent graphics and repetitive but gripping gameplay".

It was a nominee for two Nintendo DS-specific awards from IGN for their 2008 video game awards, including Best Strategy Game and Best New IP. GameSpot nominated it for "Best Game No One Played".

Criticism was made of the controls in Lock's Quest. Nintendo World Report described the controls as "finicky" and "problematic", GamesRadar+ described them as "fussy", and Pocket Gamer described the controls as "poor". Lock's pathfinding was also criticized; GameZone said that "sometimes pathfinding can be a problem [when trying to control Lock's movement]" and Pocket Gamer described Lock's pathfinding as "dreadful". Eurogamer disagreed, describing the controls as "well explained and intuitive".

Critics consistently praised the graphics of Lock's Quest. GameDaily stated that the game had "lovingly designed" visuals with "vibrant colors" used. Nintendo World Daily praised the "wonderful sprite graphics" as well as "great animation and a clean, colorful look". GameZone praised the "exemplary sprite work". Destructoid stated that the "artistic style is terrific and the graphics are all very pleasant sprite work". GamesRadar+ described the graphics as "charming", and Pocket Gamer described them as "bright and well designed".

The music was also praised. Destructoid described the music of Lock's Quest as "incredible", GameZone described it as "beautiful and epic...some of the best original music in a DS game", and Nintendo World Report described it as "very nice". GameDaily said that the music was "reminiscent of the best RPGs".

Reviewers expressed mixed opinions on the game's story. GameSpy described the game's story as "derivative" and "cliched", Destructoid stated it was "inoffensive and rather standard", and Eurogamer "standard fare". GamesRadar+ was more positive, describing it as "surprisingly mature" and that it "keeps the game moving nicely", IGN stated that it "wonderfully... [carries] its own full-fledged, quest-style experience", and GameDaily stated the story was "astonishingly good". Nintendo World Report lauded the story, but disliked the pacing, stating that the story "becomes truly fascinating around its half-way point. It just takes way too long to get there".

== Re-release ==
THQ Nordic published a remaster of the original game in May 2017 for PlayStation 4, Xbox One and PC. Developed by Digital Continue, it features a remastered graphics and soundtrack, as well as new game modes. The remaster received mostly negative reviews, with reviewers criticizing the controls and overall quality of the game.

In September 2019, Lock's Quest was released on mobile devices on both the App Store and Google Play store.
