= Emergent gameplay =

Aspect of gameplay

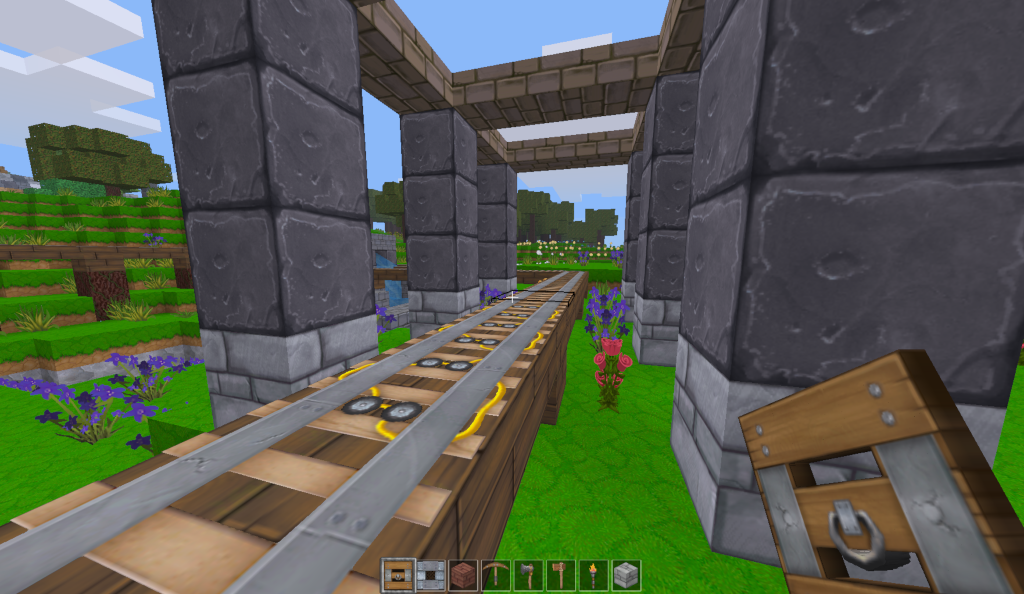
A screenshot from a game on the Luanti engine

Emergent gameplay refers to complex situations in video games, board games, or role-playing games that emerge from the interaction of relatively simple game mechanics.

Designers have attempted to encourage emergent play by providing tools to players such as placing web browsers within the game engine (such as in Eve Online, The Matrix Online), providing XML integration tools and programming languages (Second Life), fixing exchange rates (Entropia Universe), and allowing a player to spawn any object they desire to solve a puzzle (Scribblenauts).

== Intentional emergence ==
Intentional emergence occurs when some creative uses of the game are intended by the game designers. Since the 1970s and 1980s board games and role playing games such as Cosmic Encounter or Dungeons & Dragons have featured intentional emergence as a primary game function by supplying players with relatively simple rules or frameworks for play that intentionally encouraged them to explore creative strategies or interactions and exploit them toward victory or goal achievement.

=== Creative solutions ===
Immersive sims, such as Deus Ex and System Shock, are games built around emergent gameplay. These games give the player-character a range of abilities and tools, and a consistent game world established by rules, but do not enforce any specific solution onto the player, though the player may be guided into suggested solutions. To move past a guard blocking a door, the player could opt to directly attack the guard, sneak up and knock the guard unconscious, distract the guard to move away from his post, or use parkour to reach an alternative opening well out of sight, among other solutions. In such games, it may be possible to complete in-game problems using solutions that the game designers did not foresee; for example in Deus Ex, designers were surprised to find players using wall-mounted mines as pitons for climbing walls. A similar concept exists for roguelike games, where emergent gameplay is considered a high-value factor by the 2008 Berlin Interpretation for roguelikes.

Such emergence may also occur in games through open-ended gameplay and sheer weight of simulated content, like in Minecraft, Dwarf Fortress or Space Station 13. These games do not have any endgame criteria though they do, similarly to immersive sims, present a consistent and rule-based world. These games will often present the player with tutorials of what they could do within the game. From this, players may follow the intended way to play the game, or can veer in completely different directions, such as extravagant simulated machines within Minecraft.

Certain classes of open-ended puzzle games can also support emergent gameplay. The line of games produced by Zachtronics, such as SpaceChem and Infinifactory, are broadly considered programming puzzles, where the player must assemble pieces of a mechanism to produce a specific product from various inputs. The games otherwise have no limits in how many components can be used and how long the process needs to complete, though through in-game leaderboards, players are encouraged to make more efficient solutions than their online friends. While each puzzle is crafted to assure at least one possible solution exists, players frequently find emergent solutions that may be more elegant, use components in unexpected fashions, or otherwise diverge greatly from the envisioned route.

=== Emergent narrative ===
Some games do not use a pre-planned story structure, even non-linear.

In The Sims, a story may emerge from the actions of the player. But the player is given so much control that they are more creating a story than interacting with a story. Emergent narrative would only partially be created by the player. Warren Spector, the designer of Deus Ex, has argued that emergent narrative lacks the emotional impact of linear storytelling.

Left 4 Dead features a dynamic system for game dramatics, pacing, and difficulty called the Director. The way the Director works is called "Procedural narrative": instead of having a difficulty which increases to a constant level, the A.I. analyzes how the players fared in the game so far, and tries to add subsequent events that would give them a sense of narrative.

Minecraft and Dwarf Fortress also have emergent narrative features due to the abstraction of how elements are represented in game, allowing system-wide features to apply across multiple objects without the need to develop specialized assets for each different state; this can create more realistic behavior for non-player controlled entities that aid in the emergent narrative. For example, in Dwarf Fortress, any of the living creatures in the game could gain the state of being intoxicated from alcohol, creating random behavior in their movement from the intoxication but not requiring them to display anything uniquely different, in contrast to a more representational game that would need new assets and models for a drunk creature. Because these are abstract and interacting systems, this can then create emergent behavior the developers had never anticipated.

== Unintentional emergence ==
Unintentional emergence occurs when creative uses of the video game were not intended by the game designers.

=== Glitch or quirk-based strategies ===
Emergent gameplay can arise from a game's AI performing actions or creating effects unexpected by even the software developers. This may be by either a software glitch, the game working normally but producing unexpected results when played in an abnormal way or software that allows for AI development; for example the unplanned genetic diseases that can occur in the Creatures series.

In several games, especially first-person shooters, game glitches or physics quirks can become viable strategies, or even spawn their own game types. In id Software's Quake series, rocket jumping and strafe-jumping are two such examples. In the game Halo 2, pressing the melee attack button (B) quickly followed by the reload button (X) and the primary fire button (R trigger) would result in the player not having to wait for the gun to be back in position to shoot after a melee attack. Doing this has become known as "BXR-ing". Another example includes GunZ: The Duel, where animation cancels and weapon switching would eventually develop into a means of traveling along the wall known as "butterfly" in the community.

Starsiege: Tribes had a glitch in the physics engine which allowed players to "ski" up and down steep slopes by rapidly pressing the jump key, gaining substantial speed in the process. The exploitation of this glitch became central to the gameplay, supplanting the vehicles that had been originally envisioned by the designers as the primary means of traversing large maps.

Thanks to a programming oversight by Capcom, the combo (or 2-1 combo) notion was introduced with the fighting game Street Fighter II, when skilled players learned that they could combine several attacks that left no time for their opponents to recover, as long as they were timed correctly.

The PlayStation 1 version of the 2004 edition of the FIFA series featured a selection of new attacking skills like off the ball running and touch sensitive passing, all of which were designed for analog controller use. Particularly skilled players had been artificially manipulating these features into the game series since at least the 1999 edition by deft and rapid manipulation of the original non-analogue stick PS controllers. The game was relatively easy to beat on the hardest level on single player, using a series of tricks from the instruction manual which the AI could not replicate consistently or defend against, but long-term players found that in trying to make the game attain to a more realistic football simulation by playing without using these tricks, the simplistic in-game AI would seem to respond by learning osmotically from the player with greater creativity from the opposition teams and an apparent learning intelligence in selecting off the ball players and shot direction, things that were supposed to be impossible with the non-analog controller.

=== Changing game objectives ===
In online car racing games, particularly Project Gotham Racing, players came up with an alternative objective known as "Cat and Mouse". The racers play on teams of at least two cars. Each team picks one very slow car as the mouse, and their goal is to have their slow car cross the finish line first. Thus the team members in faster cars aim to push their slow car into the lead and ram their opposing teams' slow cars off the road.

Completing games without getting certain items or by skipping seemingly required portions of gameplay results in sequence breaking, a technique that has developed its own dedicated community. Often, speed of completion and/or minimalist use of items are respectable achievements. This technique has long been used in the Metroid game series and has developed into a community devoted to speedruns. NetHack has over time codified many such challenges as "conduct" and acknowledges players who manage to finish characters with unbroken pacifist or vegetarian disciplines, for example. A comparable form of restricted gameplay has been implemented within World of Warcraft, known as "Iron Man" leveling, where players cannot trade items with each other, and must delete their character if they die.

A change in gameplay can be used to create a de facto minigame, such as the "Green Demon Challenge" in Super Mario 64, where the object is to avoid collecting a 1-up which chases the player, even passing through terrain, while the player attempts to collect all red coins on a level. Other challenges have been built around reaching normally unreachable areas or items, sometimes using glitches or gameplaying tools, or by completing a level without using an important game control, such as the 'jump' button or joystick.

Machinima, the use of computer animation from video game engines to create films, began in 1996. The practice of recording deathmatches in id Software's 1996 computer game Quake was extended by adding a narrative, thus changing the objective from winning to creating a film. Later, game developers provided increased support for creating machinima; for example, Lionhead Studios' 2005 game The Movies, is tailored for it.

=== Real economy interaction ===
Traders in MMOs with economic systems play purely to acquire virtual game objects or avatars which they then sell for real-world money on auction websites or game currency exchange sites. This results in the trader's play objective to make real money regardless of the original game designer's objectives.

Many games prohibit currency trading in the EULA, but it is still a common practice.

Some players provide real world services (like website design, web hosting) paid for with in-game currency. This can influence the economy of the game, as players gain wealth/power in the game unrelated to game events. For example, this strategy is used in Blizzard Entertainment's World of Warcraft.

== See also ==
- Alternative reality game
- Cellular automaton, a 0-player "game" that can produce various emergent patterns
- Corrupted Blood incident
- Game Genie
- Immersive sim
- Metagaming
- Procedural generation § Software examples
- ROM hacking
- Hacker culture
- Sandbox game
