= Uncle Henry's Playhouse =

1996 video game

- Developer: Trilobyte
- Publisher: Trilobyte
- Platform: Microsoft Windows
- Release: November 18, 1996
- Genre: Puzzle
- Mode: Single-player

Uncle Henry's Playhouse (released in the UK as Uncle Henry's MindBlower) is the third game in The 7th Guest series. Functionally the game is a compilation game mostly composed of the puzzles from Trilobyte's games The 7th Guest, The 11th Hour, and Clandestiny, but featuring little plot. The game has been noted for its low sales figures (27 in the US) and its rarity/obscurity relative to its blockbuster predecessors, The 7th Guest and The 11th Hour. The game is primarily intended as a means of presenting puzzles from the previous titles in the 7th Guest series and consequently it has a rather simplistic plot that has been criticized by reviewers for its thinness in comparison to the previous games. The game also includes previews for two then-upcoming Trilobyte games, Tender Loving Care (eventually released by Aftermath Media) and Dog Eat Dog (never released).

== Plot ==
Henry Stauf, the main antagonist from The 7th Guest and The 11th Hour is a toymaker with a dark and disturbed imagination inclined toward the macabre and the deadly. In Uncle Henry's Playhouse, Stauf has created a twisted dollhouse, the 12 rooms of which he has furnished with miniaturized puzzles from his previous mansions. In the attic of the dollhouse Stauf has placed a thirteenth puzzle that can only be accessed once the player has satisfactorily completed the other 12 puzzles. As the player progresses through the game, Stauf observes the proceedings and offers commentary in the form of gleeful taunts for the player's failures and sounds of unhappiness for the player's successes.

== Gameplay ==
Uncle Henry's Playhouse plays like the other two games in the series employing a simple point-and-click interface for 13 puzzles. The dollhouse that serves as the setting of the game includes 12 main rooms featuring puzzles from The 7th Guest, The 11th Hour, and Clandestiny (an unrelated title not in the 7th Guest series), an attic featuring an all-new 13th puzzle, and the foyer from which the player may access the guest book. Completing each puzzle in Uncle Henry's Playhouse automatically saves the game for the player, allowing the player to quit at any time and resume from the same point by signing in through the guestbook. Unlike the previous 11th Hour, there is no option to skip puzzles that the player finds too challenging although tips are available from the foyer. In addition to the new 13th puzzle, the game also features new graphics and sound effects, however the underlying concept of the 12 main puzzles are all reused from previous games.

=== Games included ===
The puzzles are split between ten logic puzzles and three games versus the computer with four games from The 7th Guest, four games from The 11th Hour, four puzzles originally released in Clandestiny, and one all-new puzzle created specifically for Uncle Henry's Playhouse. Although all puzzles are accessible from the outset, the new 13th puzzle is only accessible after all 12 of the other puzzles have been overcome.

From The 7th Guest

- Crypts in the Basement - A Lights Out-style tile-flipping puzzle where all caskets must be closed.
- Pieces of Cake - A division puzzle in which a cake must be divided into pentominos with the same number of toppings.
- Spiders - A point-filling puzzle where as many points of an 8-pointed star as possible must be filled.
- High Lights - A logic maze where the player must reach the top of a dollhouse.

From The 11th Hour

- Blood and Honey - An Infection-style game in which the player must cover more territory than the computer.
- The Amazing Labyrinth - A Labyrinth-style tile-pushing game played against the computer.
- Book Checkers - A sorting puzzle in which the player must segregate red from green.
- Switchboard - A chess permutation problem in which the positions of 4 bishops must be swapped.

From Clandestiny

- Cursed Coins - A game of Reversi in which the player must cover more territory than the computer.
- Trade Winds - A logic maze where the player must navigate a ship to the opposite corner of a board.
- Statue Paths - A chess-based maze in which a knight must be moved to attack a rook without placing itself in jeopardy.
- Leap Frogs - A permutation puzzle wherein the positions of two groups of frogs must be swapped.

Original to Uncle Henry's Playhouse

- A logic maze where the player must travel from the attic to the front door of a dollhouse.

== Development ==
During development the game was to be titled "Castle", but was renamed Clandestiny and became the fourth title. With tight timeline constraints, Uncle Henry's Playhouse would be designed to primarily focus on the previous games in the series, eventually becoming little more than a vehicle for collecting and repackaging puzzles from the previous titles in the 7th Guest series. A single all-new puzzle would be created for Uncle Henry's Playhouse by Rob Landeros, and the design team led by Graeme Devine would be responsible for integrating the older puzzles into a cohesive whole.

== Reception ==
=== Critical reception ===
Originally intended by Trilobyte as a "collectible compilation", the game was not well-received critically and sales capped at 27 copies in the US with only 176 copies worldwide. Diehard GameFAN's Alex Lucard described the game as one of "the biggest flops in PC gaming history". Amongst other problems, the game's plot has been singled out by reviewers as lacking.

The few positive critical reviews tended to emphasize the game's connection to its parent series, the fact that new content had been added to further the story of Henry Stauf, and emphasis was placed on the quality of the puzzles in contrast to the game's low price. Other more mixed reviews suggested that the game was decent for what it was - a compilation of puzzles from the 7th Guest series. Comparing the game to the 1995 puzzle classic, Hodj 'n' Podj, Computer Games Magazine even went so far as to claim that the puzzles in Uncle Henry's Playhouse worked better in a compilation format than they did as show-stoppers in the original games.

=== Commercial performance ===
Having achieved sales topping 1 million units for The 7th Guest and setting CD-ROM industry records with 500 thousand preorders for The 11th Hour by late 1995, Trilobyte made the decision to switch from a development company to a publishing company. Fortunes reversed in 1996 and with millions of dollars tied up in development of the game Tender Loving Care, Trilobyte found itself running very low on finances by mid-1996. In light of this, the decision was made that a third member of the 7th Guest series should be released to generate much-needed funds.

The game has become something of a collector's item due to its rarity on the secondary market. The game has been re-released once as part of Encore's puzzle collection, Puzzle Madness.
