= EA Pacific =

American video game company

- Formerly: Mastertronic International Inc. (1986–1989); Virgin Mastertronic International (1989–1991); Virgin Games, Inc. (1991–1993); Virgin Interactive Entertainment, Inc. (1993–1995); Burst Studios (1995–1998); Westwood Pacific (1998–2003)
- Type: Subsidiary
- Industry: Video games
- Founded: 1995; 31 years ago
- Defunct: 2003; 23 years ago
- Fate: Dissolved, merged and folded into EA Los Angeles
- Successor: Danger Close Games
- Headquarters: Irvine, California
- Parent: Mastertronic (1986–1988); Virgin Mastertronic (1989–1991; Virgin Interactive North America (1991–1998); Westwood Studios (1998–2003)

EA Pacific (initially the internal American development divisions of Mastertronic and Virgin Games, then Burst Studios and Westwood Pacific) was a video game developer formally owned by Virgin Interactive's North American operations, and was based in Irvine, California.

The company was initially founded in 1986 as a subsidiary of Mastertronic, and Randall Masteller was the first programmer hired at the studio. Masteller was later hired by Graeme Devine, who was a close friend of Masteller. Over time, the company hired more employees like Darren Bartlett, David Perry and John Botti, all of these Virgin development executives had left to form their own studios. The development division then adopted the Burst name in 1995 as recommended by producer Neil Young.

Burst Studios was beset by production problems during its early years; Virgin Interactive's president of worldwide publishing, Brett W. Sperry, commented in 1997, "The way the Burst studio was structured made a lot of sense on paper, but for a variety of reasons, it wasn't delivering product at the end of the day." Burst Studios was acquired by Electronic Arts together with Westwood Studios and Virgin's North American publishing operations in August 1998. The company was later renamed to Westwood Pacific, under that name, the company developed or co-developed games like Nox and Command & Conquer: Red Alert 2.

It was later renamed to EA Pacific. Some actual Westwood Studios employees were still working with the studio. One of the senior modelers, who worked on Command & Conquer (1995), was part of the Command & Conquer: Generals (2003) team.

EA Pacific was absorbed into EA Los Angeles in 2003. Some employees then went to Petroglyph Games.

== Technology ==
EA started development on a new 3D engine in 2001, commonly known as the Strategy Action Game Engine (SAGE). It was based on Westwood Studios's W3D engine, which was in turn a major modification of the SurRender 3D engine developed by Hybrid Graphics Ltd. Westwood first used W3D on their first-person shooter Command & Conquer: Renegade and their massively multiplayer online role-playing game Earth & Beyond.

The first game utilizing this engine would be Command & Conquer: Generals, which would be developed under EA Pacific and finished by EA Los Angeles. The updated SAGE engine allowed for dynamic lighting that would cast realistic shadows and reflections on most objects, as well as higher quality visual effects and a stop-motion camera feature. The SAGE engine would continue to be used by EA Los Angeles on additional titles in the Command & Conquer series and on the real-time strategy series The Lord of the Rings: The Battle for Middle-earth.

With the release of later Command & Conquer (Command & Conquer 3 and onwards, the engine underwent a large overhaul of its major systems. Major upgrades included support for the PlayStation 3, an upgrade of the renderer to RNA, dynamic environmental music, and numerous minor internal improvements. A common misconception was that the new engine itself was called RNA when in fact RNA only referred to the renderer. The last title to use the SAGE engine was Command & Conquer 4: Tiberian Twilight.

== Games ==
Year	Title	Platform(s)
as Mastertronic International/Virgin Mastertronic International
1986	Las Vegas Video Poker	Commodore 64
1986	Las Vegas Video Poker	Atari 8-bit
1986	Las Vegas Video Poker	MS-DOS
1986	The Slugger	IBM PC compatible
1987	Venom	IBM PC compatible
1987	Metropolis	IBM PC compatible
1987	Shard of Inovar	MS-DOS
1987	Five-a-Side Indoor Soccer	IBM PC compatible
1987	Storm	IBM PC compatible
1987	Prowler	IBM PC compatible
1987	Kobayashi Naru	IBM PC compatible
1987	Trilogy	IBM PC compatible
1988	Quarterback	IBM PC compatible
1988	Rasterscan	IBM PC compatible
1988	Jonah Barrington's Squash	IBM PC compatible
1988	Double Dragon	MS-DOS
1989	Turbo Champions	MS-DOS
1989	House of Cards	MS-DOS
1989	Barbarian	MS-DOS
1989	Artura	MS-DOS
1989	Strike Zone Baseball	MS-DOS
1990	Caesars Palace	MS-DOS
1990	Scrabble: The Deluxe Computer Edition	MS-DOS
1990	Spot: The Video Game	MS-DOS
1990	Spot: The Video Game	NES
1990	Spot: The Video Game	Amiga
1991	Caesars Palace	Game Boy
as Virgin Games/Virgin Interactive
1991	Risk	Mac
1992	Caesars Palace	Mac
1992	Deluxe Scrabble	Windows
1992	M.C. Kids	NES
1992	Monopoly Deluxe	MS-DOS
1992	Monopoly Deluxe	Windows
1992	Prince of Persia	Game Boy
1992	Mick & Mack as the Global Gladiators	Genesis
1992	Club Racquetball	Mac
1993	Cool Spot	Genesis
1993	Cool Spot	Super NES
1993	RoboCop vs. The Terminator	Genesis
1993	Color a Dinosaur	NES
1993	Double Dragon	Game Gear
1993	The Terminator	Sega CD
1993	Disney's Aladdin	Genesis
1994	Disney's The Jungle Book	Genesis
1994	Disney's The Jungle Book	Super NES
1994	Demolition Man	3DO
as Burst Studios
1996	Spot Goes to Hollywood	PlayStation
1996	Spot Goes to Hollywood	Saturn
1996	Toonstruck	MS-DOS
1997	Grand Slam	Windows
1997	Grand Slam	PlayStation
1997	Grand Slam	Saturn
1997	SubSpace	Windows
as Westwood Pacific
1998	Golden Nugget 64	Nintendo 64
2000	Nox	Windows
2000	Command & Conquer: Red Alert 2	Windows
2001	Command & Conquer: Yuri's Revenge	Windows
as EA Pacific
2003	Command & Conquer: Generals	Windows

=== Cancelled ===
- Freak Boy
