= Cyberchase (disambiguation) =

Cyberchase is an American-Canadian animated educational children's television series.

Cyberchase may also refer to:

- Cyberchase: Carnival Chaos, a 2003 computer game based on the TV series
- Cyberchase: Castleblanca Quest, a 2003 computer game based on the TV series
- Scooby-Doo and the Cyber Chase, a 2001 direct-to-video Scooby-Doo film
- Scooby-Doo and the Cyber Chase (video game), a 2001 video game based on the Scooby-Doo film
