= Martin Alper =

Video game designer and the former President of Virgin Interactive

- Born: 1942; Tonbridge, England
- Died: June 7, 2015 (aged 72–73); Laguna Beach, California, U.S.
- Known for: Video games
- Spouse: Jamie Jensen (m. 2001)
- Children: 2

Martin Alper (1942 – June 7, 2015) was a video game designer and the former President of Virgin Interactive, once one of the largest companies in the field. Alper was a co-founder of Mastertronic, which went on to become Virgin Interactive following its acquisition by Richard Branson. He was involved with the development of Command & Conquer at Westwood Studios and Shiny Entertainment who developed The Matrix and Earthworm Jim.

Alper was the person who approached Westwood Studios co-founder Brett Sperry about creating Dune II while Cryo Interactive was still developing the first Dune game.

In an interview, he explained how he fired Rob Landeros and Graeme Devine so they could set-up their own company Trilobyte during the development of The 7th Guest. During an interview on Soren Johnson's podcast, Charles Cecil discussed meeting with Alper when Virgin Interactive was publishing Cecil's games and said that Alper boasted about the success of The 7th Guest and proudly told Cecil, "The reason I make such good decisions about what we [at Virgin Interactive] commission, is because I've never played a video game in my life."

Alper also provided the voice acting for EVA in the original Command & Conquer: Red Alert.
