= UEFA European Championship video games =

UEFA Euro
- Genre(s): Sports
- Developer(s): TecMagik; Gremlin Interactive; EA Vancouver; Konami
- Publisher(s): TecMagik; Gremlin Interactive; EA Sports; Konami
- Platform(s): Various
- First release: Champions of Europe; 1992
- Latest release: EA Sports FC 24; 2024

The UEFA European Championship has its own video games licensed from European football's governing body, UEFA. Eight games have been released so far, with the first game released in 1992. Originally held by TecMagik, it was then held by Gremlin Interactive in 1996, EA Sports from 2000 until 2012. Konami had the rights for 2016 and 2020. EA Sports have again had the rights since 2024.

== UEFA Euro 1992 ==
The game developed and published by TecMagik was released for the Master System in 1992 to coincide with UEFA Euro 1992. The game includes both single-player and multiplayer game modes. Players can play in a friendly match or in the tournament mode.

== UEFA Euro 1996 ==
The game by Gremlin Interactive modified some parts in their Actua Soccer title, including the 16 teams present in the final stage with accurate rosters and stadiums, as well as Euro 96 mode, Exhibition Match, Practice Penalties, and Practice game.

It was sold for Windows, DOS, and the Sega Saturn. The Saturn version was released in Europe only in May 1996. It was the subject of considerable media hype and was a major system-seller for the Saturn in the United Kingdom.

== UEFA Euro 2000 ==
After Electronic Arts purchased the license, it was expected by critics that the game would be as good as World Cup 98, a major hit two years before. Euro 2000 uses a modified version of the FIFA 2000 engine.

Paul Oakenfold provided the soundtrack, with the songs:

- "The Hub"
- "Headcharge"
- "Tribe"
- "Hand of God"
- "Bunker"
- "Formula" (shortened version of "Formula Football", a song included in Euro 2000: The Official Album)

Oakenfold also remixed E-Type's "Campione 2000" (the tournament's official theme song).

The game was a bestseller in the UK, replacing Gran Turismo 2.

== UEFA Euro 2004 ==
The game was released for Microsoft Windows, PlayStation 2, and Xbox on 7 May 2004. A GameCube release was cancelled.

Players can choose from 51 national teams and it includes more game modes than UEFA Euro 2000, such as a fantasy mode where two teams composed of hand-picked players square-off with each other, leagues and a knock-out "home and away" friendly match and a penalty shoot-out mode, as well as Euro 2004 qualifying, and Euro 2004 itself.

== UEFA Euro 2008 ==
The game was released for PlayStation 2, PlayStation 3, PlayStation Portable, Xbox 360, and PC on 17 April 2008. It featured all 53 teams in Europe.

== UEFA Euro 2012 ==
The game was released by EA Sports as a downloadable expansion pack for FIFA 12 on PlayStation 3, Xbox 360, and PC on 24 April 2012. It featured all 53 teams in Europe and 8 stadiums in UEFA Euro 2012. It marks a change in EA's strategy, with all previous football games centred on either the World Cup or European Championships having been released as full-priced standalone games.

== UEFA Euro 2016 ==
The game was released by Konami as a free DLC on Pro Evolution Soccer 2016. Real Madrid and Wales player Gareth Bale is featured on the cover. The PlayStation 3 and PlayStation 4 versions were released as standalone both physically and digitally.

== UEFA Euro 2020 ==
The game was released by Konami as a free DLC on eFootball PES 2020 in June 2020, and on the 2021 Season Update on launch day. It includes the official kits and player likenesses for all 55 officially licensed UEFA teams. The update also includes five out of eleven venues of the tournament, as well as the official match ball.

== UEFA Euro 2024 ==
EA Sports picked up the rights for the UEFA Euro 2024 video game, and the Euro 2024 downloadable update was released in EA Sports FC 24, EA Sports FC Mobile, and EA Sports FC Online in the summer of 2024. The mode was released on 6 June and contains 9 out of 10 venues, all 24 teams that qualified for the tournament along with 8 others that did not qualify: Finland, Iceland, Israel, Northern Ireland, Norway, Republic of Ireland, Sweden and Wales.

== See also ==
- UEFA Champions League video games
- FIFA World Cup video games
- FIFA
- EA Sports FC
- Pro Evolution Soccer series
- Actua Soccer
