= Toonstruck =

1996 video game

- European cover art
- Developer: Burst Studios
- Publisher: Virgin Interactive Entertainment
- Producers: Ron Allen; Dana Hanna
- Designers: Richard Hare; Jennifer McWilliams
- Programmers: Douglas Hare; Gary Priest
- Artist: William Skirvin
- Writers: Mark Drop; Richard Hare; Jennifer McWilliams
- Composer: Keith Arem
- Platform: DOS
- Release: NA: October 30, 1996; EU: November 1996
- Genre: Graphic adventure
- Mode: Single-player

Toonstruck is a graphic adventure video game developed by Burst Studios, published by Virgin Interactive Entertainment and released in 1996 for DOS. The game uses hand-drawn imagery and animated characters, but the protagonist Drew Blanc (played by Christopher Lloyd) is represented as a video-captured live action character interacting with the cartoon world around him. In the game, Blanc is transported into the cartoon world he created while suffering from a creative block. Blanc is accompanied by his animated sidekick Flux Wildly.

Conceived in 1993 as a game geared towards children, Toonstruck was later re-written to be more adult-oriented. Virgin Interactive invested huge amounts of money into the game, which ended up costing in excess of US$8 million. In addition to Lloyd, the cast includes several well-known actors and voice actors such as Dan Castellaneta, Tim Curry, David Ogden Stiers and Dom DeLuise. Toonstruck features scan-line compressed FMV that is composited with hand-drawn animated sequences produced by Burst, Nelvana and Rainbow Animation.

Toonstruck was well received by gaming critics, who mostly praised the quality of the animation and the design of the puzzles, but it was a financial disappointment for Virgin. It has since been included in several lists of the best adventure games of all time.

== Gameplay ==
Toonstruck is a point-and-click adventure game where the player controls Drew Blanc, accompanied by his cartoon sidekick Flux. The game uses a "Bottomless Bag" as an inventory icon, and the mouse pointer, represented by an animated white-gloved hand, is context-sensitive, changing its icon depending on what it is rolled over. Dialogue options with characters are displayed as graphical icons that represent the topic of conversation. One of the standard icons is a cube of ice (for "breaking the ice" with a character); as dialogue options are exhausted, the cube melts into a puddle of water. According to Joystick, there are 52 original characters to interact with, as well as 80 puzzles to solve and 120 objects to retrieve.

The barn before it is struck by the Malevolator's beam. Drew can be seen talking to the Carecrow as Flux is walking away. The "bottomless bag" appears on the bottom left corner

The main objective of the game is to locate and collect several items to build a machine that has an opposite effect to that of the antagonist, Count Nefarious. These components are spread throughout the three kingdoms of Cutopia, Zanydu and the Malevolands. Many of the puzzles are based on object manipulation, although there are also some logic and arcade-style puzzles. For certain parts, the player must use the abilities of Flux as a cartoon character to advance. This is done by selecting Flux and using him much like an item.

Toonstruck presents a non-linear structure. Puzzles often require using objects from one location in the others; therefore, players must travel back-and-forth through the three lands throughout the first part of the game. The second part of Toonstruck sees Drew being imprisoned in Count Nefarious's castle; this section takes place entirely within the castle, and unlike the first, Flux is not present. Similarly to the LucasArts adventure games, it is not possible to die in the game, and there are no dead-ends that require the player to start over or load an earlier save file.

== Plot ==
Animator Drew Blanc is the original creator of the Fluffy Fluffy Bun Bun Show, which has been a ten-year success for his company. In reality, the many cute talking rabbits that star in the show sicken him. His self-revered creation Flux Wildly, a wise-talking small purple character, has been denied the chance of starring in his own show. Drew's boss Sam Schmaltz sets him the task of designing more bunnies to co-star in the show by the next morning. However, the depressed animator nods off, suffering from acute artist's block. He wakes in the night to find his television switched on, announcing the Fluffy Fluffy Bun Bun Show. Drew is mysteriously drawn into the TV screen and transported to a cartoon world populated by his own creations, among many other cartoon characters. He befriends Flux Wildly and discovers that this fictional paradise is being ravaged by a ruthless new character named Count Nefarious with a weapon of evil called the Malevolator, a flying saucer which mutates the idyllic landscape and its inhabitants into dark and twisted counterparts.

Upon meeting with King Hugh, the king of Cutopia, Drew is given the task of hunting down and stopping Nefarious, thereby restoring peace and harmony to the land, in return for safe passage back to three-dimensional reality. Drew and Flux go on a scavenger hunt through the lands of Cutopia, Zanydu and the Malevolands to collect the parts needed to complete the Cutifier, a counter-weapon to Nefarious's Malevolator. After Nefarious's feline assistant Ms. Fortune informs him that Drew (referred to as an "alien") is working against him, the villain sends his henchmen after Drew and Flux, who find several ways to hide from the clumsy stooges. As Drew and Flux carry on with their quest, Nefarious continues his attacks on Cutopia, destroying Fluffy Fluffy Bun Bun's meadow; turning the kingdom's Carecrow, a friendly mannequin, into a creepy scarecrow; and turning Polly and Marge, a sheep and a cow who produce butter in a barn, into a dominatrix and a submissive in bondage.

After collecting all the parts and inserting them in the Cutifier, Drew and Flux revert the damage caused by Nefarious. After reuniting with King Hugh, Drew considers his mission finished and asks the king to be sent back to the real world. However, Hugh tells Drew that the deal was not only to save Cutopia, but to cutify Zanydu and the Malevolands as well. Hugh reveals himself to actually be Fluffy Fluffy Bun Bun in disguise, with a plan to rule over all kingdoms and become a god. Before Drew and Flux can escape, Fluffy strikes Flux with the Cutifier, turning him into her minion, and commands him to execute her evil plan. Although Drew flees, he ends up captured and taken to Count Nefarious, who injects him with a serum that will eventually turn him into a cartoon. Ms. Fortune hypnotizes Drew and he reveals the location of Flux and the Cutifier. Nefarious then goes after Flux, while Drew is imprisoned in Nefarious's castle.

Drew manages to set himself free and navigates through the castle to find the Malevolator and a gadget that can warp him to reality. As soon as he hops in the Malevolator, Nefarious appears on the saucer's screen attempting to bargain with Drew and convince him to drop his plans and in return get sent home. Drew refuses, and uses the Malevolator to destroy Fluffy, Nefarious and the Cutifier. In the process Flux is transformed back and gives Drew a transdimensional communicator so they can keep in touch. Drew activates the warp gadget and returns to the real world, thinking his adventure was just a dream. In the morning, he pitches to Sam a new series called The Flux & Fluffy Show, only for it to get shot down. As Drew resigns himself to his soulless job, Flux calls him through the communicator to warn that Fluffy and Nefarious are still alive, and Drew happily teleports back to Cutopia as he is turned to a cartoon.

== Development ==
Toonstruck was published by Virgin Interactive Entertainment and developed by Virgin's internal development studio Burst, based in Irvine, California and headlined by Chris Yates, a veteran of Westwood Studios, and Neil Young, who worked at Probe. After David Perry and his associates left Virgin in 1993, the company struggled with internal development and hired Yates and Young to lead this division. In an interview by Edge, Yates stated that all senior producers at Burst had between "eight and ten years of experience", and that the studio was focused on having quality tools and technology to develop products with high production values.

Development of the game began in October 1993, and finished in November 1996. Virgin Interactive invested much money in the project, and aimed at impressing audiences with high production values. "So much of the game was handled like a full-scale movie production", said artist John Pimpiano, who was originally tasked with doing background art for the game, but became involved with other realms of production such as character development, storyboarding, color styling and marketing promos, among others. The studio was inspired to take CD-ROM technology "even further" after the success of Virgin's The 7th Guest, and to make the game "as cinematic as possible". Overall, 230 people worked in the game. In 1994 Burst switched its early engine to that of The Legend of Kyrandia: Malcolm's Revenge, offered to them by Westwood. Since the programmers had to re-code much of the game, only about 5% of the original source code remained in the final game.

By the end of development, Toonstruck had a high budget of over $8 million ($17 million in 2025 figures). According to Next Generation, Virgin Interactive always acknowledged that Toonstruck would be expensive. Virgin Interactive insiders suggested that the animation was of an unnecessarily high level of sophistication. Furthermore, the development team spent 18 months debugging the code written for the Kyrandia engine, further delaying the release and adding to the already high production budget.

=== Writing ===
Toonstruck was meant to be a funny story about defeating some really weird bad guys, as it was when released, but originally it was also about defeating one's own creative demons.

— Co-writer and designer Jennifer McWilliams on the story of Toonstruck

Toonstruck depicts a live-action character entering a fully-animated cartoon world. Executive producer David Bishop conceptualized the game as a children's game "where a villain was draining the colour out of the world, turning it black and white". According to lead designer Richard Hare, Bishop's original concept was titled Trouble in Toonland and had as its protagonist a young boy named Daniel. However, once Bishop's concept was passed on to co-writer and designer Jennifer McWilliams, it went through several revisions to make it more adult-oriented, with comic violence and touches of parody and cynicism. According to Le Monde, Richard Hare wanted all players to be shocked at some point with the game's sense of humor.

The final screenplay was credited to McWilliams, Richard Hare and Mark Drop. McWilliams wrote the second part of the game to be more psychological, with Drew facing his fears, living out his fantasies and eventually restoring his creativity. The character of Flux Wildly was created after that of Drew Blanc, as a companion and "fun-loving" sidekick, because he gave a window "into the 'real' Drew". To McWilliams, Flux was also "a great addition" for the puzzles and humor. Developers aimed at creating a world that felt as though it was "living" and that evolved as the story events progressed. To accomplish that in writing, the NPC dialogue was programmed to change as critical events happened in the game so that characters commented on these events instead of just repeating dialogue from earlier.

With the delays to the game's production and the release date getting closer, Virgin executives decided to split the game's content in two and expected to have the unreleased half be included in a potential sequel. Due to Virgin's decision to divide the game in two, the writers had to come up with an ending that properly concluded the game "halfway through, with a cliffhanger that would, ideally, introduce part two." Since the entire story arc was carefully thought-out, McWilliams felt Virgin's decision "definitely disrupted that", but nonetheless believed the studio did well under the circumstances. In the later half of the story that was cut from the final game, Drew and Flux took a train ride to an island in the sky, where Drew faced off his fears in a carnival setting; scenes included a Wild West shootout, an encounter with Drew's idol Vincent van Gogh and a visit to a mad dentist.

=== Design and animation ===
Creative influences for Toonstruck's characters, locations and animations were the classic cartoons of Warner Bros., Tex Avery, Hanna-Barbera and Walt Disney Studios. Elements of the game were also inspired by British humor and the "lampooning" of American pop culture. Canadian animation studio Nelvana signed a deal with Virgin Interactive to produce animation for Toonstruck through Nelvana's commercials production arm Bear Spots Inc. It was Nelvana's first contract with Virgin. There were also animation cels and characters that were developed and keyframed by Burst and finished by Rainbow Animation, in the Philippines. Burst's animators did much of their work traditionally, sketching characters and their movements on paper and then animating these frames. The company used computer technology from Silicon Graphics, as well as software such as Deluxe Paint and Autodesk Animator, which were used for coloring and finishing of the animated sequences. Over 11.000 animations were made by Burst during development.

The full-motion footage of the game's live-action actors was shot in Burst's own motion capture studio, with hundreds of hours of performance against a green screen. An eight-camera Digital Betacam set-up was used in order to allow Lloyd's character to be "perfectly scalable" when viewed from every possible angle. In order to make post-production more efficient and easier, Burst first filmed empty scenes and then introduced the actor. A program by Silicon Graphics was used to calculate the difference in lighting and color between the two types of footage, thereby speeding up the process of color correction. The footage was then composited and edited together with the animation by Burst's in-house animators. Richard Hare served as director of the live-action production. According to voice actor Dom DeLuise, the makeup and costume design for Lloyd was purposely done in a way that footage of his could be easily manipulated for the game; for instance, Lloyd's jacket costume had no buttons and his hair was combed right in the middle so that his likeness could be flipped right or left without being noticeable to players.

McWilliams noted the team designed many ideas they felt were funny and interesting, without focusing on what was achievable within the budget and schedule. For the most part, the company gave the team creative freedom, but intervened when more content was made than could be included in one game and decided to cut half the material from the final game. This forced Burst to rework the game under this restriction.

=== Casting and sound ===
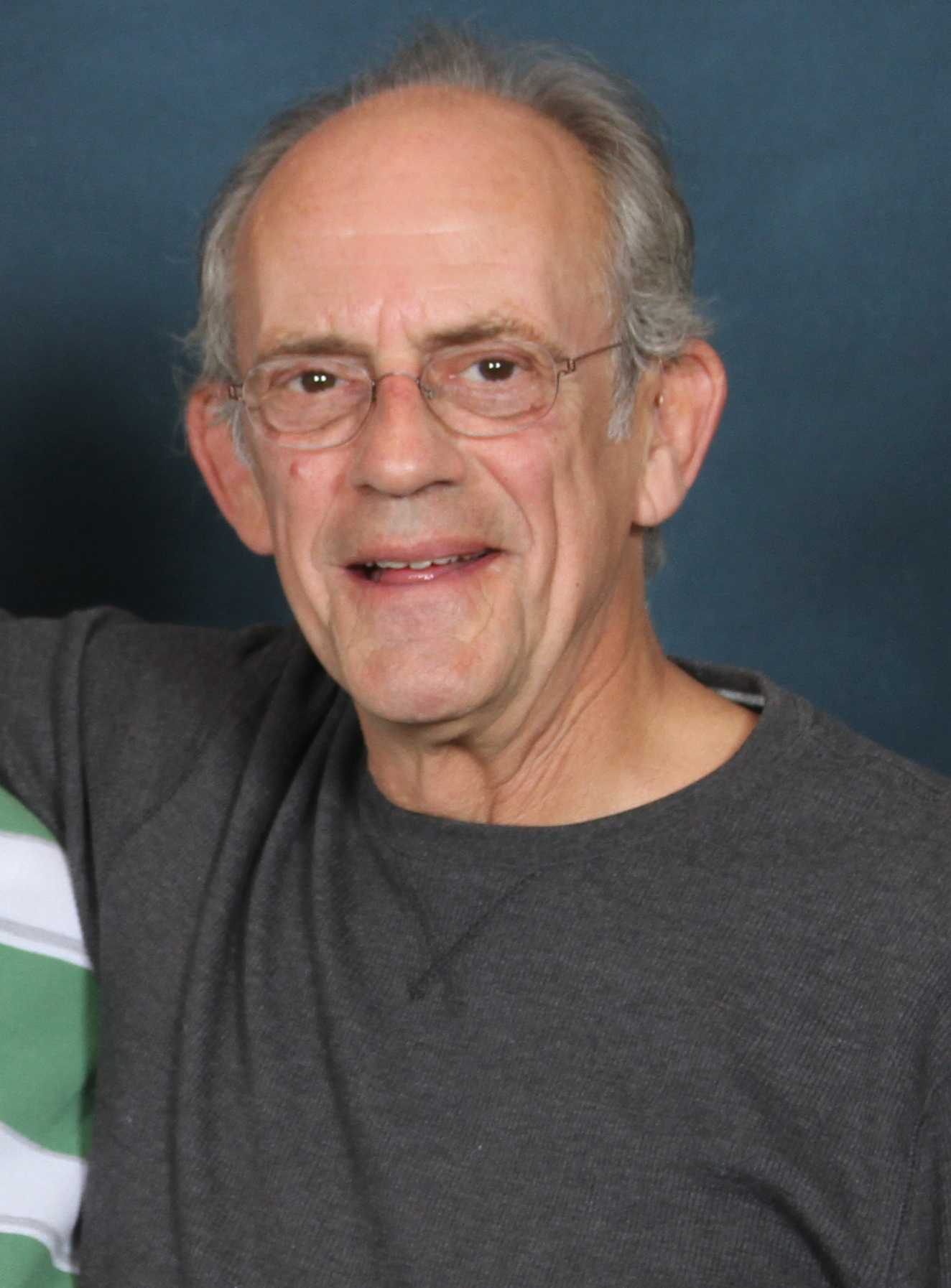
Christopher Lloyd portrayed Drew Blanc.

According to Jennifer McWilliams, most of the writing for the game was completed before the actors were cast, but the character ultimately voiced by Tim Curry was written with him in mind. Burst had initially cast a different actor to voice Flux Wildly, but replaced him with Dan Castellaneta, known for voicing Homer Simpson, after the studio decided the first choice would not be a good fit. Christopher Lloyd, then-known for his roles in the Back to the Future series and Who Framed Roger Rabbit, was cast in the live-action role of cartoonist Drew Blanc. Ben Stein played the role of Blanc's boss Sam Schmaltz, also live-action.

Curry voiced the antagonist Count Nefarious. David Ogden Stiers, known for his work in M*A*S*H and Beauty and the Beast, voiced King Hugh, the king of Cutopia. All Dogs Go to Heaven and An American Tail voice actor Dom DeLuise voiced Fingers, the octopus who is a cashier at the arcade. Additional vocal performances were given by Jeff Bennett, Corey Burton, Jim Cummings, Tress MacNeille, Rob Paulsen, April Winchell and Frank Welker.

Keith Arem was Toonstruck's voice director, animation music and sound designer. While Arem composed original music for the game, he also included a mix of public domain classical music, such as Dance of the Sugar Plum Fairy by Tchaikovsky, and production music supplied by APM, such as "Happy Go Lively" by Laurie Johnson. Sound effects from classic cartoons were also included in the sound design for Toonstruck.

== Release ==
Toonstruck was originally planned to launch Q4 1995, but was pushed to a 1996 release date in October 1995. By December 1995 the title was expected to launch Q1 1996, but was postponed again to the fall season. Toonstruck was showcased at the 1996 edition of E3. After several delays and months after being previewed at E3, the game was released in the U.S. on October 30, launching for an initial price of $59.95. It was released in Europe and other territories in November 1996. In December 1996 Virgin Interactive teamed up with Happy Puppy to launch the official website for Toonstruck, with email communication between Virgin and consumers and the ability to enter a contest to win CD-ROMs and merchandise. The postponement of Toonstruck from late 1995 to October 1996 contributed to Virgin Interactive's reported loss of $14.3 million in the U.S. in 1995.

Despite being well-received upon release from video game critics, Toonstruck underperformed in sales and was a commercial failure; this was partly attributed to a fading interest in point-and-click adventure games among consumers. VP of marketing for Virgin Simon Jeffery admitted that the company "would have liked to have seen higher sales for Toonstruck", which by December 1996 had sold over 150,000 units worldwide. Executive producer Bishop lamented the lack of an effective marketing campaign for the game, and also criticized its packaging. "As soon as you have the word 'cartoon' associated with a game, it aims it at a young audience. But this was a game for adults with a lot of adult content," Bishop stated. In an interview in March 2003, Hare echoed Bishop's sentiments on the packaging design and marketing as factors in the game's demise. Destructoid also mentioned the marketing, as well as Virgin's decision to cut the game in half, as reasons for why the game was a financial disappointment. Virgin Interactive CEO Martin Alper said he expected Toonstruck "to do better", and in response to the company's poor performance in the 1996 holiday season, began a plan in 1997 to cancel "weaker" projects, cut down on development budgets and make products that appeal to international markets, citing stronger sales from Europe than the U.S.

Nearly twenty years after being first published, Toonstruck was re-released for modern Windows systems by GOG.com on February 10, 2015, and by Steam on November 15, 2016. Both versions run on the ScummVM emulator. It has also been released by GOG.com for macOS and Linux.

== Reception ==
Reception

Aggregate score
Aggregator	Score
GameRankings	75.14%

Review scores
Publication	Score
Computer Gaming World	5/5
GameSpot	8.8/10
Next Generation	3/5
PC Gamer (US)	70%
PC Zone	93/100
Boot	8/10
Computer Games Strategy Plus	3.5/5
PC Games	A−
Entertainment Weekly	A−
Computer and Video Games	4/5
The Electric Playground	5.5/10

Toonstruck received mostly positive reviews. Brett Atwood of Billboard wrote that despite the game being "far from unique," it is "filled with plenty of challenging puzzles and cool cartoons". Entertainment Weekly's Gary Eng Walk rated the game an A−, praising the level of difficulty and puzzles while noting that the controls "are sometimes clunky". Computer and Video Games gave Toonstruck a 4 out of 5, calling it "the best point-and-click adventure for a long time". In its review, CVG compared the game favorably to LucasArts adventures games such as Day of the Tentacle and Monkey Island, and praised the "professional" cutscenes, controls and difficulty curve. Petra Schlunk of Computer Gaming World gave the game a 5 out of 5, praising the story, characters, voice work and puzzles. The Irish Times' Garrett Rowe called Toonstruck a "superb example of how to put together games of this nature", rating its graphics 90%, its sound 84% and the gameplay 93%.

Ron Dulin of GameSpot said Toonstruck was "overly-hyped for both its technical prowess and ingenious premise. ... the animation, while admirable, isn't mind-blowing, and the story is mildly amusing at best. But what's great about Toonstruck is that neither of these drawbacks matters in the slightest; the designers have made a great game by creating an experience that is entertaining and challenging but doesn't become too frustrating or too easy." He elaborated that the game is consistently clear about what the player needs to do, and the puzzles deal solely with how to go about doing it. Major Mike of GamePro found the dialogue tedious and unfunny, but praised every other aspect of the game, particularly the puzzle interface, whimsical music, and integration of live action video with fluid cartoon animation. He summarized, "Although it lags at times, it contains an excellent blend of puzzle-solving and cartoon animation." Edge described Toonstruck as "the closest any post-Monkey Island effort, with the possible exception of Broken Sword, has come to getting the ingredients right," and gave the game an 8 out of 10. The magazine praised the game's puzzles and highlighted the non-linear aspect of the game. The review did criticize the integration of digitized live-action footage with the animated scenes, and stated the humor was excessively over-the-top at parts of the game.

Aaron Ramshaw of Adventure Gamers wrote that Toonstruck "remains one of the best adventures ever made" twenty-two years after it first came out. Ramshaw described the characters as "superbly crafted and portrayed" and Lloyd's comic timing as "particularly praiseworthy". Ramshaw also praised the quality of the animated cinematics, the non-linear puzzle design and musical score. Adventure Classic Gaming's Cyrus Zatrimailov gave the game a 4 out of 5 score; he praised the graphics but had mixed thoughts on the puzzles, believing some of them to be "totally absurd" and "plain weird".

Some reviews were less positive. Next Generation focused on the script, and assessed that "the dialog, slapstick humor, and relentless 'comedy' situations are tired and mostly ripped off from past and present cartoon creations. You've seen most of these jokes before, and done better 40 years ago." Dave Nuttycombe of The Washington Post praised Lloyd's performance, but wrote that after it "wears off, you're left with conventional art and a public-domain soundtrack", and described the game as "tedious". Hardcore Gaming 101 writer Kurt Kalata gave a mixed review of the game, with praise towards the "varied yet unique" art style, the audio and voice acting. However, Kalata criticized the writing as not "terribly good" and the dialogue as "rarely any funny", and wrote the game feels incomplete. The Electric Playground rated the game a 5.5/10 and described the hype associated with it as "unwarranted". The review also criticized the originality of the story and characters, as well as the puzzles, but praised the use of Flux in the game as a "neat aspect".

=== Recognition ===
Toonstruck was named the 37th best computer game ever by PC Gamer UK in 1997. The game was a finalist for Computer Gaming World's 1996 "Adventure Game of the Year" award, which ultimately went to The Pandora Directive, and was a runner-up for Best Adventure Game of 1996 by GameSpot, losing to The Beast Within: A Gabriel Knight Mystery. In 2011, Adventure Gamers named Toonstruck the 93rd-best adventure game ever released, commending the writing and the story as "genuinely funny". PC Gamer included the game in its 2017 list of the best adventure games. TechRadar's Jordan Oloman included the game in his list of the 7 best adventure games on PC, singling out the "stellar" cast, puzzles and characters for praise.

== Cancelled sequel ==
One of the scenes from the unreleased sequel

After the game's financial failure, Virgin cancelled plans to make a sequel to Toonstruck, which would have used content cut from the first installment. Audio director for the game Keith Arem, who obtained the animation rights to Toonstruck, has expressed interest in re-releasing the game as a remastered version, which would include the second half of the game. However, after stating he would need "tremendous" fan support to justify a Toonstruck re-release, a petition calling for the sequel was created in 2010 by fans. A Facebook group and a Twitter account were also launched to support the endeavor; the Facebook group currently has over 2,000 members.

In February 2014, Arem posted on Facebook stating that he would need to raise "significant capital and fan interest" to attract investors and bring the re-release project to life. According to posts from Arem in 2016, there are still unresolved copyright issues preventing him from going forward with the project, but wrote that his team has been "working to consolidate" and negotiate rights.

Prior to Arem's interest in reviving Toonstruck 2, an Internet forum of dedicated fans of the game had previously attempted to piece together the unreleased content into a playable fan-made game. The increased interest in a Toonstruck 2 has also led to the creation of a creepypasta story centered around the unreleased sequel.

== See also ==
- Hollywood Monsters
- Leisure Suit Larry: Love for Sail!
