= Thunde-Rin Guns, Game of the Wild West =

Board game

Thunde-Rin Guns, Game of the Wild West is a 1984 board game published by Standard Games and Publications.

== Gameplay ==
Thunde-Rin Guns, Game of the Wild West is a game in which the players control the Outlaws, the Gunmen, and the Sheriff, with each of them having their own victory condition.

== Reception ==
Matthew J. Costello reviewed Thunde-Rin Guns, Game of the Wild West in Space Gamer No. 71. Costello commented that "I liked this game. As is usual with Standard Games, each character's counter is a unique individual, with differing abilities. The map of the town and its environs is atmospheric and it's fun to play on. While strategy seems obvious at times [...] there are enough options to keep the game a close match. The rules are clear, simple, and have nice bits of business with exploding safes and the classic stagecoach robbery. This one's definitely worth, er, a shot."

== Reviews ==
- Space Voyager
