= Starship Duel =

Boards games based on the Star Trek series'

Starship Duel is a pair of 1984 board games published by FASA.

== Gameplay ==
Starship Duel I and Starship Duel II are Star Trek games which each involve a ship from the Federation opposing a Klingon ship.

The two games are Starship Duel I: Enterprise vs. Bird of Prey, and Starship Duel II: U.S.S. Reliant vs. Klingon L-9.

== Reception ==
Steve Nutt reviewed Starship Duel I for Imagine magazine, and stated that "Despite its initial oddity, the game is easy to play. one great advantage is that there is no game board to speak of. If you Blu-tacked the counters to your control board you could easily play the game on a bus or train, for example. The game's major drawback is that it is very expensive for what you get."

Matthew J. Costello reviewed Starship Duel I and Starship Duel II in Space Gamer No. 72. Costello commented that "you'll quickly get the hang of it, and so will any lucky soul you introduce to these addictive games. Needless to say, I strongly recommend them."

== Reviews ==
- Games #60
- Article about Star Trek games in Different Worlds
- Asimov's Science Fiction v9 n4 (1985 04)
- Isaac Asimov's Science Fiction Magazine
