= Spot: The Video Game =

1990 video game

- North American NES box art
- Developer: Virgin Mastertronic
- Publishers: Virgin Mastertronic; Arcadia Systems (NES)
- Designer: Graeme Devine
- Artist: Robert Stein III
- Composers: Ken Hedgecock (NES, Amiga); Geoff Follin (Game Boy)
- Series: Spot
- Platforms: NES, Game Boy, MS-DOS, Amiga, Atari ST Commodore 64
- Release: NES: NA: September 1990; JP: October 16, 1992; MS-DOS: NA: 1990; EU: August 1991; Amiga, Atari ST, C64: EU: August 1991
- Genre: Strategy
- Modes: Single-player, multiplayer

Spot: The Video Game is a video game developed and produced by Virgin Mastertronic in 1990/1991 for the Amiga, Atari ST, MS-DOS computers, Game Boy and Nintendo Entertainment System. It is the first video game to feature the then-current 7 Up mascot "Spot", and was later followed up by platformers Cool Spot and Spot Goes To Hollywood.

== Gameplay ==
As the player makes a move, an animation of 7-up mascot Spot appears.

Gameplay is based on a strategy table game called Othello or Reversi, which originates from 1883, but it takes place on a 7×7 board, though in some variations, certain locations on that board would be unavailable.

Two to four players alternated turns, with each player controlling pieces of a specific color. On each turn, a player selects an existing piece of his color, and then an empty position one or two squares away. If the selected location is one square away, a new piece is created in that location; otherwise, the chosen piece moves from its original location to the new location. In either case, all adjacent pieces are then changed to that player's color.

Spot: The Video Game offered an animated approach to moving the pieces. Depending on the proximity and direction of the move, the Spot character would appear as the moving piece and do a dance, roller skate, cart wheel, dive, fall backwards, etc. to the destination location.

The NES and DOS versions allowed up to four players, each designated by a specific color. Human players would hand off controllers so all members could make their moves when their turn arose.

== History ==
Originally called Infection, the game was invented by Dave Crummack and Craig Galley in 1988 for Wise Owl Software, which then sold the rights to Virgin Mastertronic UK. Although versions of Infection were programmed for Amiga, Commodore 64, and Atari ST, none saw a commercial release. Eventually, the game was picked up by Virgin Mastertronic US, who licensed it to Leland Corporation, who then released it as the arcade game Ataxx in 1990. Around the same time, Virgin released its own version of the game, Spot: The Video Game. Infection was initially intended to be a budget release, and when the 7-up branding was added, Spot was sold as a full-price title. Infection, while never seeing a commercial release, was released by developer Gary Dunne into the public domain in 1994. Infection also appeared on the cover disk of issue 49 of Amiga Power.

Designer Graeme Devine stated in a retrospective interview that the NES version of Spot was created "over six weeks with no development hardware or software".

For a limited time, a mail-in promotion was offered to purchase the NES version for $24.99, along with four labels from specially marked 7up bottles.

== Reception ==
Reception

Review score
Publication	Score
Electronic Gaming Monthly	7/10, 8/10, 7/10, 8/10 (NES)

Wyatt Lee reviewed the game for Computer Gaming World, and stated that "SPOT: The Computer Game offers a simple concept with cute graphics and stimulating game play. It offers fast play, multi-player interaction, a long shelf life and much delight."
