= Ataxx =

1990 video game

- Japanese arcade flyer
- Publishers: Capcom; Leland Corporation
- Platform: Arcade
- Release: 1990
- Genre: Strategy
- Modes: Single-player, multiplayer

Ataxx (アタックス) is a strategy video game published in arcades by Leland Corporation in 1990. Two players compete on a seven-by-seven square grid. The object of the game is for a player to have a majority of the pieces on the board at the end, by converting as many of their opponent's pieces as possible. In a single-player game, the opponents are "bio-invaders from a different dimension."

The concept was invented earlier by Dave Crummack and Craig Galley for the unreleased 1988 video game Infection. Virgin Mastertronic licensed it to Leland as well as using the design in its own Spot: The Video Game released the same year as Ataxx. There are numerous independently-developed clones. Although Ataxx was sold as a video game and not with a physical game board, it can be played with a Reversi set.

== Gameplay ==
A game in progress

Each player begins with two pieces (red for player 1 and blue for player 2). The game starts with the four pieces on the four corners of the board, with red in the top left and bottom right and blue on the other two. Red moves first.

During their turn, players move one of their pieces either one or two spaces in any direction. Diagonal distances are equivalent to orthogonal distances, i.e. it is legal to move to a square whose relative position is two squares away both vertically and horizontally. If the destination is adjacent to the source, a new piece is created on the empty departure square. Otherwise the piece on the source moves to the destination. After the move, all of the opponent player's pieces adjacent to the destination square are converted to the color of the moving player. Players must move unless no legal move is possible, in which case they must pass.

The game ends when all squares have been filled or one of the players has no remaining pieces. The player with the most pieces wins. A draw may occur when the number of squares is even, either from non-playable squares or nonstandard sizes having an even number of squares. Some versions also implement the threefold repetition rule from chess.

The game is timed, similarly to blitz chess. Each player's timer counts down while it is their turn to move; they lose if it reaches zero, but may buy more time (100 seconds per quarter) while the game is in progress. After completing a game (whether they won or lost), a player may choose whether or not to play another game with the time remaining.

== Development ==
Originally called Infection, the game was invented by Dave Crummack and Craig Galley in 1988 for Wise Owl Software, which then sold the rights to Virgin Mastertronic UK. Although versions of Infection were programmed for Amiga, Commodore 64, and Atari ST, none saw a commercial release. Eventually, the game was picked up by Virgin Mastertronic US, which licensed it to the Leland corporation, who then released it as the arcade game Ataxx in 1990. Around the same time, Virgin released its own version of the game, Spot: The Video Game for the Nintendo Entertainment System, IBM PC compatibles, Game Boy, and Commodore 64, based on Cool Spot, a character from a 7 Up marketing campaign of the time.

== Legacy ==
In 1993, Virgin released the Trilobyte-produced game The 7th Guest, which contains a version of Ataxx as its Microscope Puzzle. Graeme Devine of Trilobyte, co-creator of The 7th Guest, had overseen the production of Spot: The Video Game while working at Virgin. In April 2011, an updated version of the Microscope Puzzle was released as a stand-alone app for iPad under the title The 7th Guest: Infection.

Hexxagōn screenshot

Hexxagōn, an IBM PC compatible game created by Argo Games and published by Software Creations in 1993, uses a hexagonal board, as does the 1995 sequel to The 7th Guest, The 11th Hour. Hexxagōn would later be adapted into a Flash-based game programmed by Paul Neave for the Neave Interactive website.

Boogers is an online 4-player variation hosted by the ImagiNation Network, a pre-internet dial-up game network. Two to four players fight on a 9x9 board.

The Sierra educational game Mega Math includes a clone of Ataxx where the player must answer math questions in order to move.

Many independently developed games have borrowed the Ataxx concept.
