= The 7th Guest: Infection =

2011 video game

- Logo
- Developer: Trilobyte
- Publisher: Trilobyte
- Designer: Rob Landeros
- Programmers: John Fricker; Scott Lawrence
- Composer: Christopher Getman
- Platform: iPad
- Release: April 27, 2011
- Genre: Strategy
- Modes: Single-player, multiplayer

The 7th Guest: Infection is a 2011 abstract strategy mobile game which originally appeared as the microscope puzzle in the 1993 computer game The 7th Guest. It is based on the Ataxx family of board games, whose lineage began with a 1988 computer game called Infection.

== Gameplay ==
The object of the game is for the player to make their microbes the majority on the board by the end of the game. This is accomplished by infecting and converting the opponent's microbes.

The board is a square grid divided into 7 rows and 7 columns. Each player begins with two microbes, colored blue or red. The microbes are placed at the four corners of the grid, with blue in the top left and bottom right corners, while red occupies the other corners. Red takes the first turn. During a turn, a player may move one of their microbes one or two spaces in any direction, including diagonally. If the player moves to an adjacent space, a new microbe is created on the space the microbe moved from. If the player moves to a non-adjacent space, the space on which the microbe began the turn remains empty. Any of the opponent's microbes which are in spaces adjacent to the space a player moves onto will be "infected", turning to the color of the player who has moved. Players are required to move unless no legal move is possible. The game is over when either all cells of the board are filled or all microbes on the board are the same color. The player with the most microbes on the board at the end of the game is the winner.

The game can be played in either single-player or two-player mode. In single-player mode the opponent is the mad genius Henry Stauf, antagonist of The 7th Guest, who verbally taunts the player throughout the game. The player may choose from seven difficulty levels when playing against the AI.

== Development ==
The earliest version of this game was made in 1988 by Wise Owl software. Written by Dave Crummack and Craig Galley, Infection was programmed on the Amiga, Commodore 64 and Atari ST platforms. The rights to the game were subsequently sold to the Leland Corporation, who released it as an arcade game under the name Ataxx. The game became best known by this title.

In 1993 Trilobyte released The 7th Guest, which included a version of the game as the Microscope Puzzle. When Trilobyte re-released The 7th Guest for iPhone and iPad in 2010, they announced that some puzzles, including the Microscope Puzzle, would not be included due to technical challenges associated with adapting the original game to the new platforms. However, once the player has completed the game, they can access the older version of the Infection game, by simply clicking on any top corner of the menu board, and pressing the image for the laboratory. This puzzle, along with several others, can be played using this method. An updated version of the Microscope Puzzle was released for iPad as The 7th Guest: Infection, featuring updated graphics and gameplay settings in April 2011.
