= Frog cloning =

Frog cloning may refer to:

- Ataxx, a computer-based board game
- the cloning of tadpoles in biology
