= Tender Loving Care (video game) =

- DVD cover.
- Directed by: David Wheeler
- Written by: David Wheeler
- Based on: Tender, Loving Care by Andrew Neiderman
- Produced by: Rob Landeros (also designer)
- Starring: Michael Esposito; Beth Tegarden; John Hurt; Marie Caldare
- Cinematography: Calvin Kennedy
- Edited by: Marie Walling Thompson
- Music by: John Welsman
- Distributed by: Aftermath Media (United States); Blue Swan Entertainment
- Release dates: August 12, 1998 (DVD, Windows); September 10, 2012 (iOS); March 30, 2017 (Steam)
- Running time: 117 minutes
- Language: English

Tender Loving Care is a 1998 psychological thriller interactive film produced and distributed by Aftermath Media. Starring Michael Esposito, Marie Caldare, Beth Tegarden, and John Hurt as Dr. Turner. It was written and directed by David Wheeler and produced by Rob Landeros, who also designed the interactive features. The game was originally produced with the intention of releasing the game under the Trilobyte label, but Landeros was fired from the company before it was released. Tender Loving Care was later released under Landeros's new company, Aftermath Media, on CD-ROM, with the option for users to watch the movie as a feature-length film as opposed to interacting with the game. In October 2012 the game was re-released under the Trilobyte Games label on the Apple iOS platform. The game is based on the 1984 novel of the same name by Andrew Neiderman.

== Plot ==
Michael Overton (Michael Esposito) and his wife Allison (Marie Caldare) are a couple who have been traumatized by the death of their daughter in a car accident. Allison has been especially affected, as she has been unable to even acknowledge that her daughter has died. She lives in a trance-like state and is unable to perform normal adult functions. Dr. Turner (John Hurt) recommends the Overtons hire a live-in nurse to assist with Allison's psychological healing. They hire a nurse recommended by Dr. Turner, Katherine Randolph (Beth Tegarden), whose unorthodox methods cause tensions to arise in the Overton home.

== Interactivity ==
Producer/designer Rob Landeros described Tender Loving Care as not a game, but a film that the audience can have a game-like experience while watching it. The film is divided into a number of story episodes, between which the user interacts with the story in various ways. After viewing a story episode, users are asked a series of questions by Dr. Turner to test their perception of what they have seen. Users are then allowed to navigate through a graphic reconstruction of the Overton house, where they may gather additional details of the story. Before returning to the film or Apple device, users must take a short Thematic Apperception Test (TAT), which profiles the user's psyche. The film includes alternate scenes and multiple endings which can be influenced by the user's involvement.

== Development and release ==
Director David Wheeler, who co-wrote Trilobyte's The 11th Hour, initially envisioned Tender Loving Care as a non-interactive film but after production efforts fell through, he re-teamed with Trilobyte to develop the title as a game. Due to Trilobyte's difficulties, Wheeler and Rob Landeros founded their own company, Aftermath Media to complete the project.

The game saw limited success in North America, where it was primarily released as a DVD-Video title, but was more successful in Europe, particularly in Germany where it was accompanied by an extensive marketing campaign. However, Wheeler stated that royalties for the German release were to be paid to Trilobyte, which by the time of release was defunct. Landeros has stated that they never recouped the production budget. In Australia, in 2008 the DVD was released by Payless Entertainment as a double feature together with the film Divorce, and again in 2009 by Payless Entertainment as a double feature with the film The Commissioner also starring John Hurt.

The 2012 iOS release was censored to comply with Apple's App Store guidelines.

== Reception ==
In his book All Your Base Are Belong to Us, Harold Goldberg criticized Tender Loving Care as being the "wrong direction to take" with Trilobyte.
