= Grand Slam (video game) =

1997 sports video game

- Cover art featuring Jeff Bagwell and Scott Servais
- Developer: Burst Studios
- Publisher: Virgin Interactive Entertainment
- Platforms: PlayStation, Sega Saturn, Microsoft Windows
- Release: Saturn: NA: May 1997; PlayStation: NA: May 1997; Windows: NA: May 31, 1997
- Genre: Sports video game
- Modes: Single-player, multiplayer

Grand Slam is a baseball video game developed by Burst Studios and published by Virgin Interactive Entertainment for the Sony PlayStation, Sega Saturn, and Microsoft Windows in 1997.

Grand Slam was met with mixed reviews, and any possibility of a sequel was eliminated when Virgin reconfigured to publish only PC games early in 1998.

== Gameplay ==
Grand Slam is a baseball video game that includes both a pitching meter and a power meter.

== Reception ==
Reception

Review scores
Publication	Score		
Publication	PC	PS	Saturn
AllGame	N/A	2.5/5	N/A
CNET Gamecenter	4/10	N/A	N/A
Computer Games Strategy Plus	2.5/5	N/A	N/A
Computer Gaming World	1.5/5	N/A	N/A
Electronic Gaming Monthly	N/A	7.75/10 (Note: Two critics of Electronic Gaming Monthly gave the PlayStation version each a score of 7.5/10 and 8/10.)	N/A
Game Informer	N/A	4.5/10	4.5/10
GameFan	N/A	78%	N/A
GameSpot	5.1/10	6.5/10	N/A
IGN	N/A	6/10	N/A
Next Generation	N/A	2/5	N/A
PC Gamer (US)	72%	N/A	N/A

Grand Slam received mostly mixed reviews. Critics agreed that the pitching and batting controls, while obviously derived from golf video games, are innovative and add a new depth of control to the baseball genre. However, they lambasted the graphics and animation, often describing them as reminiscent of the 16-bit era. Next Generation concluded that "Grand Slam has all the features and options in place, but ultimately can't make up for substandard graphics and slow pace." Other reactions to the selection of features and options were mixed; Darren Lerhman of GameSpot and GamePro both found that though they were generally ample, the absence of create-a-player and team licenses stood out, since most of the game's competitors included these features. Lerhman nonetheless judged that "It may not have the team licenses, fifty years worth of statistics, or incredible graphics, but it is indeed fun (and it does have real MLB players). Suffice to say baseball fanatics will be disappointed by this title, but casual sports fans looking for an enjoyable baseball sim may find themselves willing to overlook these shortcomings." GamePro's assessment was similar but more dismal: "... if you can overlook the game's faults, you'll have a pretty good time playing. But with an extraordinary game like Triple Play 98 on the market, why settle for anything less?" (Note: GamePro gave the PlayStation version 3.0/5 for graphics, 2.5/5 for sound, 4.5/5 for control, and 3.5/5 for fun factor.)
