= Clandestiny =

1996 video game

- Developer: Trilobyte
- Publisher: Virgin Games
- Designer: James Yokota
- Platforms: Windows, Macintosh
- Release: NA: 1996; WW: January 2011 (OS X)
- Genre: Puzzle
- Mode: Single-player

Clandestiny is a 1996 puzzle video game developed by Trilobyte and published by Virgin Games for Windows. After the profit loss of The 11th Hour, the second game created by Trilobyte, the producers went on to make a more kid-friendly version of The 7th Guest series. The game was re-released in January 2011 on the Mac App Store.

== Gameplay ==
Clandestiny is the third puzzle game made by Trilobyte, with mix of first-person gameplay and third-person cartoon. Like The 7th Guest and The 11th Hour, the game is played by wandering a castle, solving logic puzzles and watching animated videos that further the story. The main protagonist learns the secrets of his family's past along with the help of characters who further the story by providing clues and hints.

The plot is played out by characters through animated clips as the player progress between rooms, solving puzzles of shifting nature and increasing difficulty. The puzzles include mazes, chess problems, logical deductions, and word manipulations.

== Plot ==
The story is of a young man named Andrew J. MacPhiles (voiced by W. Morgan Sheppard) who has recently inherited a Scottish castle, being the last MacPhiles standing, full of ghosts, and an earldom along with it. With his girlfriend Paula (who wants to be the next Countess MacPhiles) and a friendly handyman named Fergus, Andrew must solve the mystery of the MacPhiles curse and the goal of an evil force trying to claim the ancient legacy of the MacPhiles.

As he explores the castle and solves various puzzles, he learns that the curse is one of cowardice - many ghosts reveal they died because of their own cowardice or the cowardice of a family member. He also discovers that the butler is actually a dragon that is an enemy of the MacPhiles, and is trying to locate the Stone of Scone, a powerful magical stone, somewhere in the castle.

Andrew eventually slays the dragon, finds the Stone of Scone, but the castle is destroyed in the process. Andrew, Paula, and Fergus pack up the car to head back home with the Stone of Scone, but only Fergus is aware that all the MacPhile ghosts are tagging along...

== Development ==
During development the game was to be titled "Castle". All backgrounds were designed and drawn using Autodesk 3D. The characters were drawn and animated using Animo, which was also used to draw sketches before being rendered by Autodesk. So many images were produced that they had to be stored in an entire room.

== Reception ==
Reception

Review score
| Publication | Score |
|---|---|
| PC Games | A− |

Clandestiny sold 20,000 units.
