= Pink Goes to Hollywood =

1993 video game

- Developers: HeadGames (Genesis); Manley & Associates (SNES)
- Publisher: TecMagik
- Designer: Carol Manley (SNES)
- Programmers: Genesis; Dan Rosenfeld; Jonathan Miller; Joshua Singer; Super NES; Jeffrey Blazier
- Artists: Genesis; Douglas Nishimura; Steven Ross; Super NES; Clayton Kauzlaric; Jonathan Sposato; Edward Pun
- Composers: Mark Miller; Jason Scher; Ted Allen
- Platforms: Super NES, Genesis
- Release: NA: November 1993; EU: April 21, 1994
- Genre: Platform

Pink Goes to Hollywood is a Pink Panther themed platform game published in 1993 for the Super Nintendo Entertainment System and Genesis by TecMagik. The two releases were developed independently by different companies: the Genesis version by HeadGames and Super NES by Manley & Associates. Both are similar in theme and aesthetics, but different in layout and game mechanics.

== Gameplay ==
=== Super Nintendo Entertainment System ===
When the game is started, the player is taken to a level titled “Honey, I Shrunk the Pink” (a homage to 1989's Honey, I Shrunk the Kids), which serves as the hub that leads to all the other levels of the game; here, the Pink Panther – who serves as the ‘player character’ – is shrunken down to the size of a billiard ball, and the player must navigate him through a house to access the other levels whilst avoiding rats, which serve as this level's hazards.

The Pink Panther himself starts each level off with one unit of extra health, which is represented by a hat he is wearing. If the Pink Panther runs into or is hit by a hazard, he loses one unit of extra health. If the Pink Panther doesn't have any extra health left, he will not be wearing a hat; and if he runs into or is hit by a hazard without any extra health, he will perish and the player will lose one life – the same thing will happen, regardless of the amount of extra health the Pink Panther has on hand, if he falls into an abyss. The player can increase the Pink Panther's extra health by collecting spare hats that have been placed around each level, and the player can gain extra lives by collecting icons shaped like the Pink Panther's head that are also placed around each level.

Throughout each level, the player can also collect “Tricks” that can be used to help eliminate or avoid hazards; there are multiple sorts of “Tricks” - e.g. a stoplight causes nearby hazards to freeze, making them easier to avoid or hit. Each trick, when used, will vanish and cease its effect after a certain period of time.

Just like with most platform games, the player gets a “Game Over” when the Pink Panther perishes and doesn't have any more extra lives to re-spawn; but rather than being a simple menu that asks if the player wishes to continue, the “Game Over” screen is a level in itself: This “Game Over” level, which starts and ends like any other level in the game takes place in a Studio; the Pink Panther spawns in an area with 2 studio doors, one on ground level marked “Exit” and one high up on a girder marked “Continue”. Going through the door marked “Exit” will clear the level and reset the game; going through the door marked “Continue” will take the player back to the level they were on and also replenish the Pink Panther with 5 extra lives, but to get to this door, the player needs to collect a token that has stairs on it - which is placed right above the Pink Panther at the start of the level - and use it at the nearby “Toll” to spawn a staircase that the Pink Panther can climb to get to the door.

=== Genesis ===
Like in the SNES version, The Pink Panther also starts the game shrunken down and inside a house, which also serves as the hub that leads to all the other levels of the game; but unlike the SNES version, the hub isn't a level that's supposed to be finished, and there are no hazards nor abysses that can harm the Pink Panther. From here, the player can navigate the Pink Panther to all the other levels.

With the exception of “Refrigerator” and its sub-levels, after the Pink Panther selects a level, he is taken to a “Sound Stage” that leads to a door – with the name of the level on a sign next to it – that leads to the start of the level; throughout the “Sound Stage” are multiple hazards, such as falling sandbags and cameras and spotlights that move by themselves – which will cause harm to the Pink Panther if he comes in contact with them. After the Pink Panther completes a level, he is taken back to the main hub and a barrier that reads “Set Closed” lands in front of the completed level's entrance.

The Pink Panther has more units of health in this version than he does in the SNES version, and the amount of health he has is indicated to the player via a health bar at the top of the screen. The Pink Panther will lose some of this health if he runs into or is hit by a hazard without; and if he runs out of health, he will perish and the player will lose one life – the same thing will happen, regardless of the amount of extra health the Pink Panther has on hand, if he falls into an abyss. The player can increase the Pink Panther's extra health by collecting square icons with a heart on them that have been placed around each level, and the Pink Panther can also gain brief invincibility (which is indicated by the Pink Panther flashing) by collecting square icons with a paw-prints on them. The Pink Panther's health resets to 100% when he enters or completes a level.

== Reception ==
Reception

Review scores
Publication	Score
Joypad	77% (Genesis)
Super Play	76% (SNES)
Electronic Games	83% (Genesis); 75% (SNES)
Nintendo Acción	74 (SNES)
Digital Press	5/10 (SNES)
MegaForce	86% (Genesis)

Electronic Games gave the Genesis version 83%, and the SNES version 75%. Spanish magazine Nintendo Acción gave the SNES version 74. Digital Press gave the SNES version 5 out of 10. MegaForce gave the Genesis version 86%.

== See also ==
- Spot Goes To Hollywood
