= FTL Newsfeed =

- Genre: Science fiction
- Created by: F. Paul Wilson; Matthew J. Costello
- Starring: Joseph McKenna; Jon Avner; Allen R. Middleton
- Country of origin: United States
- No. of seasons: 4
- No. of episodes: 1,106

Production
- Executive producer: Vida S. Pelletier
- Running time: 30 seconds (season 1); 60 seconds (seasons 2–4)
- Production company: Sci-Fi Channel

Original release
- Network: Sci-Fi Channel
- Release: September 24, 1992 – December 20, 1996

Related
- FTL Newsfeed Special Behind the Scenes

FTL Newsfeed is a fictional micro-series newscast shown on the Sci-Fi Channel from 1992 to 1996. The show, portraying the fake channel FTL's first news broadcast, consists of 30-second to 1-minute snippets of news bulletins from 150 years in the future. The future timeline is fraught with stories of genetic engineering issues, technology trends, space exploration, future entertainment, right to privacy issues, and geopolitical intrigue. FTL Newsfeed was created by F. Paul Wilson and Matthew J. Costello and was filmed in New York. The series ended in a cliffhanger in December 1996.

The first segment, aired on September 24, 1992, introduced a screening of "the only known complete print of the 165-year-old science-fiction masterpiece Star Wars".

== See also ==
- Futurism
