= Andre Agassi Tennis =

1993 video game

- Mega Drive box art
- Developer: TecMagik
- Publisher: TecMagik
- Producers: Fuzzy Furry; Greg Omi
- Designer: Greg Omi
- Programmer: Greg Omi
- Artists: Karen Mangum; Jean Z. Xiong; Muffy Vasale
- Platforms: Master System, Game Gear, Genesis, Super NES, mobile phone
- Release: Genesis: NA: January 1993; EU: August 1993; Master System: EU: June 1993; Super NES: JP: March 31, 1994; NA: May 1994
- Genre: Sports
- Modes: Single-player, multiplayer

Andre Agassi Tennis is a tennis video game released in 1993, starring tennis legend Andre Agassi. The game was released for the Super Nintendo Entertainment System, Genesis, Master System, and Game Gear. It enjoyed a much belated release for mobile phones.

== Gameplay ==
The player can play in either career mode, exhibition mode, or practice mode where the player can learn to hit and receive tennis balls in a proper manner in order to assure victory on the tennis court.

During the career mode, the player travels to tennis courts around the world and competes in tournaments where victory allows the player to win money. After mastering all the tournaments, the player actually plays against Mr. Andre Agassi in a final grudge match in order to determine who is the best tennis player in the world. All the other players are generic except for him.

== Reception ==
Reception

Review score
Publication	Score
Sega Master Force	67%
