= Champions of Europe =

1992 video game

- Developer: TecMagik
- Publisher: TecMagik
- Platform: Master System
- Release: EU: June 1, 1992
- Genres: Sports, simulation
- Modes: Single-player, multiplayer

Champions of Europe is a traditional football simulation video game released for the Master System in 1992 to coincide with the UEFA Euro 1992 football tournament. It was developed and published by TecMagik. It is a top-down football game that was the only official game of the tournament available for the Master System. Box artwork and in game screens feature the official logo of the tournament and the image of the official mascot, Berni the Bunni.

== Game modes ==
The game feature both single-player and multiplayer game modes. Practice mode allows one player to pass the ball around the pitch without there being any opposition players on the field. Exhibition mode allows one or two players to compete in a single "friendly" match. The other mode is Tournament. There is also a demo mode so players can watch a match being played. The menu screen allows a player to choose from a selection of referees, although there is no noticeable difference between them.

=== Tournament mode ===
As this game was the Sega Master System's only official game of Euro 92 it allowed either one or two players to progress through the tournament from the group stages to the final. As with the actual tournament there are two groups of four teams in the first stage, moving on to two semi-finals and culminating in the final. The player can choose to play as any country in Europe (as of the time of production), which is selected from a map screen. If there are two human players entered, player two will plays as the opponent for all of player one's matches through the competition.

== Gameplay ==
=== Visuals ===
The match is viewed from a 75° angle, and there is the option of where to place the pitch radar if the player wishes to have it on the screen at all. Each team has correct kit colours for their respective country, however these are always plain shirts.

=== Controls ===
The Sega Master System control pad has two action buttons. In Champions of Europe one button is used for passing/tackling and the other button for shooting. While not in possession of the ball a button can be pressed to generate a "speed-burst". The directional pad allows for player movement and for applying "aftertouch" to a shot or pass. There is the ability to change the formation while in possession of the ball, but this is considered impractical during gameplay

=== Sound ===
On the introduction animation there is an uptempo soundtrack.

The game's title screen, showing official branding

There are a few in-game sound effects, those being for the ball being kicked or bouncing and the referee's whistle. An additional feature is that the players and referee often display speech bubbles with brief wording to represent what is being said between players.

=== Glitches ===
- There is a glitch (which some players exploit in order to cheat) that gives the player points for scoring in their own net.
- Another glitch occurs when quitting a game with a 0–0 scoreline at the semi-final stage of the tournament. This automatically propels the player into the final.

== Reception ==
- In issue 34 of Zero magazine, reviewer Patrick McCarthy gave the game a score of 87%. His only real criticisms relating to collision detection for the goalkeepers, and the aforementioned formation changing function.
