= The 7th Guest =

1993 video game

- Developer: Trilobyte
- Publisher: Virgin Interactive Entertainment
- Producers: Stephen Clarke-Willson; David Luehmann; David Bishop
- Designers: Rob Landeros; Graeme Devine
- Programmer: Graeme Devine
- Artists: Robert Stein III; Rob Landeros
- Writer: Matthew Costello
- Composer: George Sanger
- Platforms: MS-DOS, CD-i, Classic Mac OS, Windows, iOS, Android, OS X, Linux, Nintendo Switch, PlayStation 4, PlayStation 5
- Release: April 28, 1993: DOS; NA: April 28, 1993; EU: June 23, 1993 CD-i; NA: October 1, 1993; EU: November 17, 1993 Mac OS; NA: February 1994 Windows; NA: 1997; EU: 1997 iOS; NA: December 15, 2010 Linux; WW: October 19, 2013 Android; WW: April 14, 2015 Remake; WW: June 4, 2026
- Genres: Interactive movie, puzzle adventure
- Mode: Single-player

The 7th Guest is a 1993 interactive movie puzzle adventure game developed by Trilobyte and published by Virgin Interactive Entertainment for DOS. It is one of the first computer video games to initially be released only on CD-ROM. The 7th Guest is a horror story told from the unfolding perspective of the player, as an amnesiac. The game received press attention for making live-action video clips a core part of its gameplay, as well as for its unprecedented amount of pre-rendered 3D graphics and its adult content.

The game was critically and commercially successful, selling over two million copies. Alongside Myst, it is widely regarded as a killer app that accelerated the sales of CD-ROM drives. Bill Gates called The 7th Guest "the new standard in interactive entertainment". The game has since been ported in various formats on different systems.

== Gameplay ==
The game is played by wandering through a mansion, solving logic puzzles and watching videos that further the story. The main antagonist, Henry Stauf, is an ever-present menace, taunting the player with clues, mocking the player as they fail his puzzles ("We'll all be dead by the time you solve this!"), and expressing displeasure when the player succeeds ("Don't think you'll be so lucky next time!").

One of Stauf's many puzzles: This one requires the player to arrange the cans into a cryptic sentence without vowels.

A plot of manipulation and sin is gradually played out, in flashback, by actors through film clips as the player progresses between rooms by solving twenty-one puzzles of shifting nature and increasing difficulty. The first puzzles most players encounter are either one where players must select the right interconnected letters inside the lens of a telescope to form a coherent sentence; or a relatively simple cake puzzle, where the player has to divide the cake evenly into six pieces, each containing the same number of decorations. Other puzzles include mazes, chess problems, logical deductions, Simon-style pattern-matching, word manipulations, and a difficult game of Ataxx, similar to Reversi. For players who need help or cannot solve a particular puzzle, there is a hint book in the library of the house. The first two times the book is consulted about a puzzle, the book gives clues about how to solve the puzzle; for the third time, the book completes the puzzle for the player so that the player can proceed. After each puzzle, the player is shown a video clip of part of the plot, if the hint book was consulted three times, the player does not get to view the clip. The hint book can be used for all but the final puzzle.

== Plot ==
The game begins with a flashback to 1935 in the town of Harley-on-the-Hudson. A drifter named Henry Stauf kills a woman to steal her purse, beginning a series of deplorable acts. He has a vision of a beautiful doll, and the next day begins carving it. He trades the doll for food, drink and a place to stay at a local tavern. Stauf has other visions of dolls and toys, and crafts and sells these as well. Stauf becomes a successful toymaker. He uses his fortune to build a mansion at the edge of town, following another vision. At the same time, several children possessing Stauf's toys contract a mysterious illness and die. Stauf disappears into his mansion and is never seen again.

In the game's present, the narrator (the player's character) named "Ego" awakens in the Stauf mansion. The mansion is deserted, but as Ego explores it, he has ghostly visions of events in the past. These visions all take place on a night sometime after the deaths of the children, where six guests were invited to the Stauf mansion: Martine Burden, a former singer; Edward and Elinor Knox, a dissatisfied middle-aged couple; Julia Heine, a bank worker who reminisces of her youth; Brian Dutton, a fellow shop owner; and Hamilton Temple, a stage magician. The six arrive but find no sign of Stauf or anyone else. They discover a number of puzzles that give them instructions. They learn that Stauf wanted them to bring him a seventh, uninvited guest: a boy named Tad who entered the house on a dare. The guests debate what to do. Elinor and Hamilton feel they must find Tad and help him escape Stauf's plan. The others search for Tad in earnest to claim their reward from Stauf. The evening becomes bloody as the guests turn on one another or become trapped by Stauf's machinations. Julia, the last survivor, drags Tad to the attic where Stauf waited for them. Having made a pact with the evil force that gave him his visions and killed the children, Stauf has transformed into a horrific creature. He needs Tad's soul to complete the pact. Stauf kills Julia and entangles Tad with a prehensile tongue.

Ego realizes that he is the spirit of Tad, witnessing the events of that night over and over but previously unable to help; the house has been a purgatory for him. Ego finds he can now intervene in the events, and helps Tad to escape. Stauf is unable to recapture the child, and the evil entity consumes Stauf for failing to complete the pact. Tad thanks Ego for his help, and then Ego steps into a sphere of light and disappears.

== Cast and characters ==
- Henry Stauf (Robert Hirschboeck) – The owner of the mansion in which the game takes place. Stauf was a homeless drifter who became a successful toymaker after a series of visions showed him the toys he would create, but the people of Harley know nothing of his past. They only know him as the eccentric old man who makes marvelous toys for their children and became a hugely successful "rags to riches" story. His name is an anagram of Faust.
- Ego (Keith Ranney) – The player's character, a disembodied consciousness that moves through the house solving puzzles and observing the events of that mysterious night at Stauf's house as they unfolded long ago. The entire game takes place in first-person view through Ego's eyes. Ego does not know how he came to the house, or why, he only knows that there is a reason for him to be there that he hasn't figured out yet.
- Tad (Douglas Knapp) – A boy who lives next door to the Stauf mansion. On the night of the party he enters the house on a dare by climbing in through a window, then discovers that he can't get out again. He spends most of the game dodging Stauf's guests while he tries to find a way to escape the house.
- Martine Burden (Debra Ritz Mason) – Young, pretty, and ambitious, Martine Burden was once named Miss Harley-on-the-Hudson, but she hated the small town and left as soon as she had the chance. Now she is back after her wealthy boyfriend dumped her. She is immediately attracted to the older Edward Knox, whose desires for wealth and a new life away from Elinor are quite compatible with her own desires for power and status. In one scene the player sees her apparently being pulled underwater in a bathtub and hears a long drawn-out scream.
- Edward and Elinor Knox (Larry Roher and Jolene Patrick) – An older, married couple. Elinor is a decent woman who still loves her husband and seems to want to help the boy, Tad, as much as she can. Edward is having severe financial difficulties, and he shows little love or concern for his wife, instead teaming up with the younger Martine Burden to try and solve the mystery. His greatest desire is to start over with a new life, a full bank account, and no marriage tying him down. The desire of Elinor is also to start over again, but with Edward still at her side. Edward is killed by Hamilton Temple, who slams his head into the side of a coffin in order to save Tad. The player does not see Elinor get killed, but the last time she's seen, she is turning into a mannequin, pitifully calling out to Tad for help.
- Julia Heine (Julia Tucker) – An older woman, and quite vain. She is unhappy with her life, and recently lost her job at the bank due to a quickly developing drinking problem. Her heart's desire is to be young and beautiful again, when she felt like she could take on the world. Julia succeeds in bringing Tad to Stauf, but instead of making her wish come true, Stauf mercilessly kills her by spitting acidic bile at her.
- Brian Dutton (Michael Pocaro) – A middle-aged man who walks with a cane, Brian owns a shop in Harley-on-the-Hudson, and has sold goods to Stauf. Brian admires the way Stauf had grown wealthy and the way he had solved his own problems, and his greatest desire is to be as successful as Stauf, but he is also haunted by memories of seeing his brother fall through thin ice and drown when he was a child. Brian is stabbed repeatedly by Edward while they fight over Tad (ironically with his own knife), but he survives. Later, when he returns to his room and sees the suitcase of money Stauf had left him, his excitement causes his wounds to open up, and he dies.
- Hamilton Temple (Ted Lawson) – A professional stage magician nearing the end of his career, he is a kindly man who also tries to help Tad, and he gets along well with Elinor Knox. His greatest desire is to know if there is such a thing as real magic. After trying to convince Tad to trust him, Hamilton is later strangled to death by Julia.

== Music ==
The second disc of the CD-ROM set included a single audio track playable on a CD player. In total, the track was almost half an hour long and it included both the in-game music, composed by video game musician George "The Fat Man" Sanger, and two live music recordings: "The Game", whose melody in various permutations and stylistic variations became the background music for most of the game (as well as the theme for a piano puzzle) and whose lyrics (sung on the disc by Cotton Mather vocalist Robert Harrison) were based on Stauf's twisted plot, and the ending credits theme, "Skeletons in My Closet", a jazzy tune with a female lead voice (Kris McKay), parts of which are used in the game as Julia's theme. A few years later, Sanger independently released an album titled 7/11, which was a little over an hour long and contained all the music from T7G (this time, on separate tracks) as well as its sequel, The 11th Hour.

Portion of Sanger's "The Game" leitmotif

The in-game music had conventions similar to the use of leitmotif in Sergei Prokofiev's Peter and the Wolf, wherein each guest was assigned a musical theme; where Peter and Wolf used instrumental changes for its characters, The 7th Guest, conversely, used stylistic variations on the melody of Sanger's "The Game". Where two characters interact in the story, the styles are fused, counterpointed, or even sounded simultaneously and when tension abounds, the characters' themes are reflected thusly.

== Development ==
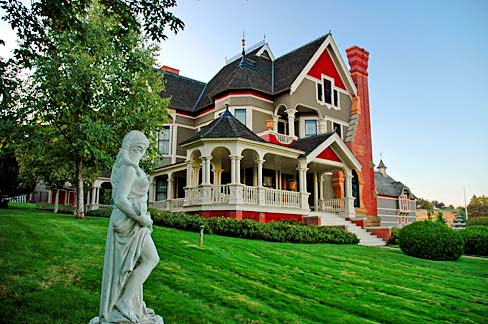
The Nunan House in Jacksonville, Oregon, on which the exterior of Stauf's mansion was based

The 7th Guest was the brainchild of game designer/graphic artist Rob Landeros, and a Virgin Mastertronic programmer, Graeme Devine. When Landeros and Devine presented their idea for the game to Martin Alper, CEO of Virgin Games, they were promptly "fired" so that with Virgin's help they could start their own company, Trilobyte, dedicated solely to the development of this game. The game's POV video of walking through the house was originally planned as a live-action video in a practical set, but the idea was abandoned after pre-rendered 3D sequences proved feasible and more cost-effective.

After creating the design document Devine and Landeros gave it to writer Matthew Costello. The developers chose to use 24-bit Super VGA graphics and a simple, textless, TV remote control-like user interface to make the game the answer to the question "What would Mom play?", and to simplify porting to game consoles such as the SNES-CD. Devine created the GROOVIE game engine, which allowed continuous streaming of data from CD-ROM, ran on multiple platforms, and was reusable. The 7th Guest was the first graphic adventure to use 640x320 graphics with 256 colors; Trilobyte reportedly spent more than $500,000 over more than two years to produce the graphics. George Sanger created the soundtrack.

The developers found that, as Devine said in 1993, "CD-ROM is bloody slow". Early blue-screened footage was imperfect and left ghostly auras, which they left in as a feature. The puzzles they intended to use were under copyright, so the developers used puzzle books from the 19th century. Cast members' work on FMVs was different from traditional filmmaking: They performed all possible actions players chose in a game, usually looked into the camera to react to the player, and usually did not react to others on the chroma key sets. Devine said that he cried when watching the end credits play for the first time: "It had been such a hard game to make and I was so exhausted from the process of getting it finished that seeing those credits play through made me realise what we had done".

The 7th Guest was one of the first games for the PC platform to be available only on CD-ROM, since it was too large to be distributed on floppy disks. Computer Gaming World reported in 1993, "not only does Guest consume an entire CD-ROM ... it actually requires TWO". Removing some of the large movies and videos was not an option, as they were essential to the gameplay. This game, along with LucasArts' Star Wars: Rebel Assault and Broderbund's Myst, helped promote the adoption of CD drives, which were not yet common.

== Reception ==
Reception

Review scores
Publication	Score
AllGame	4.5/5 (PC); 4.5/5 (MAC)
Electronic Gaming Monthly	CDI: 9/10, 8/10, 7/10, 8/10
Hyper	MAC: 88/100
Next Generation	CDI: 3/5
CD-i	CDI: 90%
Power Unlimited	CDI: 70%

=== Critical reception ===
The PC version of the game received generally positive reviews from critics. Jim Trunzo of White Wolf stated that "The 7th Guest is a brilliant piece of software that heralds new standards. While it isn't a perfect piece of programming, it's a great start towards that elusive goal." Chuck Miller of Computer Gaming World was critical of the game, calling it "a nightmare and a dream" and stating that despite its lengthy delay, the game should have been developed further. While praising the "rich, enjoyable gaming experience", he found that the minimum system requirements were unrealistic and encountered stability and software incompatibility issues. Miller concluded that he felt "deprived of the full pleasure" of playing the game, and the testing done prior to its release was insufficient. The magazine stated in April 1994 that the game was "consistently ranking high in our [reader] polls", and recommended it to puzzle fans who "want to see and hear some of the most exceptional computer graphics and music created to date". Electronic Entertainment called it "the first truly compelling interactive CD-ROM game". Bill Gates called The 7th Guest "the new standard in interactive entertainment".

The CD-i version received mostly positive reviews. GamePro's review lauded the "sinister" story line, the challenging puzzles, the graphics, and the creepy tone. The four reviewers of Electronic Gaming Monthly reviewers described it as superior to any of the computer versions of the game. Like GamePro, they praised the game's puzzles, graphics, and tone. Power Unlimited gave the CD-i version a score of 70%, describing it as having "beautiful computer graphics" with a "quite scary" story and "extremely difficult" puzzles. Next Generation rated this version three stars out of five, and stated that "the smooth video, crisp sound, original tracks featuring the almost famous 'FAT MAN'—combined with devilish puzzles—makes for a lavish CD-i game". The Macintosh version of the game was reviewed by Paul Murphy in Dragon, who said: "The Seventh Guest suffers from an incurable case of confusion about what it is trying to be. It's either a collection of puzzles encumbered by an unnecessary horror setting and story—or it's a horror story and setting encumbered by an unnecessary collection of puzzles".

The 7th Guest won Electronic Entertainment's 1993 "Breakthrough Game" award. It won the award for Best CD Computer Game at Cybermania '94. In 1995, Flux magazine ranked the game 23rd on their Top 100 Video Games. They praised the game's atmosphere and plot. In 2011, Adventure Gamers named The 7th Guest the 82nd-best adventure game ever released.

=== Sales ===
In its first year, it sold 450,000 units and earned more than $15 million. Its sales reached 500,000 units by 1994, exceeded one million copies by 1995 (higher than Myst at the time), and sold in excess of 2.3 million copies worldwide by 1997. It is widely regarded as a killer app that accelerated the sales of CD-ROM drives. In July 1995, it was the best-selling game on CD-ROM, with sales of 1.5 million copies. By April 1998, The 7th Guest had sold 929,611 units and earned $40 million in revenue in the United States. This led PC Data to declare it the country's eighth-best-selling computer game for the period between January 1993 and April 1998.

== Legacy ==
The 7th Guest and Myst are considered to be the killer apps that popularized CD-ROM for computer systems.

=== Sequels ===
Trilobyte released a sequel of The 7th Guest titled The 11th Hour in December 1995. The game's reception was initially mixed and did not sell as well as expected. Plans for further sequels to the series were initiated, but never completed due to the initial demise of the company. Landeros attempted to create his own official third installment titled The 7th Guest Part III: The Collector, releasing a trailer for the game onto his official website, only for the trailer to disappear and no further information on the series being released.

Trilobyte also released a compilation game made up of the puzzles from both The 7th Guest and The 11th Hour as well as Clandestiny titled Uncle Henry's Playhouse. The game was poorly received, only selling 27 copies in the United States.

Ports of both The 7th Guest and The 11th Hour were planned, with The 7th Guest being ported to the CD-i format. Initial plans for The 11th Hour to be ported to the 3DO platform eventually fell through. In 2010, the first game in the series was ported to the iPhone and iPad, with the series later also being ported to other systems such as the Macintosh. A stand-alone version of the Microscope Puzzle from the original version of The 7th Guest was later released under the name The 7th Guest: Infection. The puzzle had been excluded from the game for technical reasons and features two versions of the puzzle, a somewhat updated version of the puzzle as well as an older version of the Infection game that can be unlocked by beating the main game. In 2013, Trilobyte partnered with Night Dive Studios to re-release both The 7th Guest and The 11th Hour on Steam.

Trilobyte, relaunched under Rob Landeros, started a Kickstarter campaign on Halloween 2013 for The 7th Guest 3: The Collector. However, it failed to meet its funding target of $435,000. Another crowdfunding campaign was started at Crowdtilt with a smaller goal of $65,000 to build the first story of the haunted mansion but also failed to reach the goal.

=== The 13th Doll ===
In July 2015, developer Attic Door Productions, having received licensing from Trilobyte for a commercial release pending success in gaining sufficient public interest and funding, began a Kickstarter campaign for an unofficial fan game to The 7th Guest titled The 13th Doll. The campaign target was set at $40,000, running until August 27. The campaign had 1,199 backers and $60,266 was pledged. The game was released on October 31, 2019. Its story centers on a grown-up Tad, the original seventh guest of the first game, revisiting the house to face his past; Robert Hirschboeck reprised his role as Stauf. The player has the option of two playable characters to explore the house and solve puzzles. The newer game engine also allows the player to explore the house freely, moving away from the original "on rails" movement.

Adventure Gamers gave the game 3 out 5 stars and summarized that "While it doesn't quite rise to the level of the classic horror puzzler that inspired it, The 13th Doll is a fairly enjoyable tribute that ought to please those who spent the past two decades wanting more Stauf."

=== The 7th Guest: The Board Game ===
In April 2017, Trilobyte launched a Kickstarter campaign for The 7th Guest: The Board Game. The game features a Cluedo-like board design and figures representing the guests from the original PC game. Players must solve Puzzler Cards to get credit for unlocking specific rooms in the Stauf Mansion with the ultimate goal to reach the room at the top and to receive their heart's desires.

=== 25th Anniversary Edition ===
In April 2019, Trilobyte and MojoTouch released the remastered 25th Anniversary Edition of the original game for Windows, replacing the previous version on Steam and GOG.com.

Apart from the digitally enhanced original movie clips and sound, the release contained a completely reworked control system, a map, the possibility to skip scenes and new menus. The player can choose between the original soundtrack and MIDI or Adlib synth music, with or without "retro" mode (with original image, sound and controls).

The release also contained a large amount of extras: three new language soundtracks and subtitles, deleted features, and behind-the-scenes clips, 36 tracks audio, a complete novel and script, along with a Making of featurette. It also included the possibility to download the original versions for Windows, macOS or Linux.

The 25th Anniversary Edition is also available on Android, iOS and iPadOS.

=== Console and VR releases ===
In April 2023, Trilobyte and MojoTouch released a new console edition for the Nintendo Switch, which has most of the features from the 25th Anniversary Edition while supporting all of the console game modes: TV, touch, tabletop and both Joy-Con and Pro controllers. In July 2024, the console edition was ported to PlayStation 4 and PlayStation 5.

Vertigo Studios and Exkee developed a virtual reality version of The 7th Guest for Meta Quest, PlayStation VR2, and Windows-based VR headsets. It was released on October 19, 2023. The game had similar story and fully explorable VR environments with new puzzles better suited for VR, and the prior full-motion video clips were replaced with newly filmed (new actors) clips using volumetric video.

Vertigo subsequently announced the remake of The 7th Guest for Nintendo Switch, PlayStation 5, Windows, and Xbox Series X/S systems in March 2026, using similar updates from the VR version, such as volumetric video. The game was released on June 4, 2026. The game featured several changes such as all-new games, new rooms, and an updated ending. The characters have been heavily redesigned and the storyline features new plot points. The ending has also been changed; when Julia brings Tad to Stauf she is age regressed until she no longer exists, after which the player competes against Stauf for the boy's soul.

== See also ==
- List of horror video games
