= Rasterscan =

1987 video game

- Developers: Binary Design (John Pickford, Steve Hughes, Ste Pickford)
- Publisher: Mastertronic
- Programmers: Commodore 64; Phil Allsopp
- Platforms: ZX Spectrum, Commodore 64, Amstrad CPC, MSX
- Release: 1987
- Genre: Puzzle
- Mode: Single-player

Rasterscan is a video game published in 1987 by Mastertronic for the ZX Spectrum, Commodore 64, Amstrad CPC, and MSX. It was written by Binary Design based in Parsonage Gardens, Manchester with the C64 version programmed by Phillip Allsopp.

== Plot ==
The Rasterscan, a large damaged spacecraft, is drifting uncontrollably towards a nearby star. The Rasterscan can still be controlled and piloted to safety but only by a droid called MSB. Unfortunately, MSB is also damaged and (without help) can only repair toasters. The player needs to control MSB and, hopefully, use it to save the unfortunate spacecraft.

== Gameplay ==
The player controls MSB, a spherical droid who can float through the interior of the ship in all directions. MSB can interact with the craft's machinery and instruments, which all serve a purpose. It also needs to solve logic-puzzles in order to open doors (different puzzles for each door) to allow it access to more parts of the spacecraft.
