= TecMagik =

Defunct video game developer

TecMagik Entertainment Ltd.
- Industry: Video games
- Founded: 1991
- Defunct: 1994
- Headquarters: Redwood City, California

TecMagik Entertainment Ltd. was a Californian video game development and publishing company that released games for 8-bit and 16-bit games consoles between 1991 and 1994. While the company moved on to developing games for original PlayStation and Nintendo 64 platforms, those games were cancelled prior to release.

== Releases ==
- Andre Agassi Tennis
- Champions of Europe
- The NewZealand Story
- Pac-Mania
- Pink Goes to Hollywood
- Populous: The Promised Lands
- Shadow of the Beast
- Sylvester and Tweety in Cagey Capers

== Cancelled games ==
- The Final Option - A game in development in the mid-1990s for the SNES and Sega Genesis that would have starred Steven Seagal. The game was cancelled prior to release, but a fully-playable beta version of the game leaked onto the internet many years later.
- Deadly Honor a separate action game featuring actor Seagal announced for a late 1997 release for both the original PlayStation and the Nintendo 64. The game was cancelled in its beta stages and never released in any capacity for either platform.
- Roto Gunners - A helicopter simulation game announced for the Nintendo 64 in 1997, with a release scheduled for the following year. It never released in any capacity.
