= Spot Goes to Hollywood =

1995 video game

- European Mega Drive cover art
- Developers: Eurocom (Mega Drive/Genesis); Burst Studios (Saturn, PS)
- Publishers: Virgin Interactive Entertainment: Genesis; JP/EU: Virgin Interactive Entertainment; NA: Acclaim Entertainment
- Composers: Tommy Tallarico (Genesis); Keith Arem (Saturn, PS)
- Series: Spot
- Platforms: Mega Drive/Genesis, Sega Saturn, PlayStation
- Release: Mega Drive/Genesis: EU: November 1995; NA: 1995; Saturn: JP: January 10, 1997; NA: January 22, 1997; EU: 1997; PlayStation: NA: November 30, 1996; JP: January 10, 1997; EU: February 15, 1997
- Genre: Platform
- Mode: Single-player

Spot Goes to Hollywood is a 1995 platform game developed by Eurocom and published by Acclaim Entertainment in North America and Virgin Interactive Entertainment in Europe for the Mega Drive/Genesis as the sequel to Cool Spot. Saturn and PlayStation versions were later released with full-motion video clips and isometric graphics. The player controls Spot, the mascot of the 7 Up soft drink, as he travels to various places trying to free his friends.

The game received mixed reviews from critics, depending on the platform. Critics praised the graphics and level design, but criticized the game for its sound effects (in the Genesis version), controls, and objects being hard to see due to gaps covering them.

== Description ==
Genesis/Mega Drive gameplay

The central character in the game is Spot. Spot has become trapped in a movie projector. As he jumps from film to film, he encounters many classic film genres. These make up the various levels of the game. In the Sega Genesis/Mega Drive version of the game, the main levels are a pirate movie, a horror movie, an adventure movie, and a sci-fi movie. In the Sega Saturn and PlayStation version of the game, the main levels are a pirate movie, an adventure movie, and a horror movie, but there is also a Western movie, a dinosaur movie, and a sci-fi movie which are unlocked by finding all five stars in each of the game's levels. Finding all the stars also grants a better ending upon the game's completion.

There are red dots scattered around the levels. Collecting 100 of these earns an extra life.

== Plot (Sega Saturn and PlayStation version) ==
A bubble goes through Hollywood, which ends up inside a movie theater and pops as it hits a Cool Spot soda vending machine. Spot himself falls out with a can of soda and wanders into the employee room as he starts up a movie projector. As he goes inside he is trapped inside the projector and gets sent into the movies showing on the screen.

The first movie Spot ends up is a pirate movie, as he travels through various pirate ships and even rides on a cannon. He defeats a giant octopus and then finds himself in an adventure movie, where he finds himself on canyons, a minecart ride, a temple and defeats a giant spider along the way. Spot then heads to the last movie, the horror movie, which has Spot heading through a graveyard and a large staircase.

What happens next depends if the player doesn't get all the hidden stars in every level. If the player doesn't get them all, the horror movie finishes, Spot's friends cheer for Spot for succeeding through the movies, but Spot notices that the player didn't fully complete the game, and so he takes himself back into the movie projector and gets sent to them, again.

If the player does get all the hidden stars in every level, the horror movie's bonus stage sends Spot to space and then the last level; It's full of Stars, where Spot rides a spaceship and fights a giant robot mech. Spot then defeats the mech after a weight falls onto it. Spot manages to free himself from the movies and all his friends cheer. Spot wanders out of the theater, and all the Spots escape along with him because various monsters from the movie want their revenge, and so chase after Spot up until the staff credits roll, and escape out the door.

== Reception ==
Reception

Review scores
| Publication | Score |
|---|---|
| Electronic Gaming Monthly | 7.125/10 (GEN); 6.875/10 (PS1) |
| Next Generation | 2/5 (GEN); 1/5 (PS1) |
| Sega Saturn Magazine | 70% (SAT) |

Writing about the Genesis version, all four of Electronic Gaming Monthly's reviewers were impressed with the graphics and level design, and while one of them felt that the isometric perspective and controls make the game frustrating to the point of being unplayable, the other three felt that the difficulties presented by the perspective and controls actually enhance the experience. A reviewer for Next Generation also considered the graphics impressive and found the isometric perspective presented no difficulty at all due to the "diagonally oriented control method". He nonetheless concluded that "in a final analysis, the game offers only enough excitement to be considered average." GamePro gave it a negative review, complaining of the player character's slowness, the way the isometric perspective makes it difficult to judge where ledges are, the "average at best" graphics, and the poor sound effects.

Though not outright panned, the PlayStation and Saturn versions received more uniformly negative reviews, with critics universally remarking that the isometric perspective makes it hard to judge where objects are and makes the controls confusing on all the possible control configurations. The four reviewers of Electronic Gaming Monthly said that the graphics are enhanced to the point where they are impressive even on the more powerful PlayStation, and were particularly enamored of the cutscenes, but found it hard to enjoy due to the control issues and jerky scrolling. Scary Larry of GamePro was impressed with the graphics, scenery, and audio, but said the control issues make the game "drastically unplayable." Doctor Devon, reviewing the Saturn version for the same magazine, similarly said "It's a shame the charming graphics and sounds are left high and dry by the spotty gameplay." Stephen Fulljames of Sega Saturn Magazine said the game compared well to fellow isometric platformer Sonic 3D Blast in terms of graphics, but not in terms of gameplay. He particularly criticized the completely linear structure of the levels, opining that the consistent goal of moving up and right makes the game monotonous. In contrast to EGM and GamePro, Next Generation's reviewer said the PlayStation version showed "no significant upgrades or extras" over the Genesis version. He also criticized the player character's lack of personality, and said the sense of discovery present in the best platformers is absent from the game.

== See also ==
- Pink Goes to Hollywood
