= Cyberchase: Carnival Chaos =

2003 educational video game

- Cover art for the game.
- Developer(s): Basis Applied Technology
- Publisher(s): The Learning Company
- Series: Cyberchase
- Platform(s): Windows macOS
- Release: 2003
- Genre(s): Edutainment

Cyberchase: Carnival Chaos is a 2003 computer game developed by Canadian studio Basis Applied Technology and published by The Learning Company, based on the edutainment TV series Cyberchase.

== Gameplay ==
Similarly to Cyberchase: Castleblanca Quest, the game features: eight activities, video footage and full screen animation, tracking feature lets parents monitor progress, adventure and practice modes, and three levels of difficulty.

== Critical reception ==
Common Sense Media gave the game a rating of 4/5 stars. The site wrote "Kid-testers were impressed by how the program turned everyday carnival games into fun, logical challenges. Because the games are easy to play but hard to win, kids jumped right in". USA Today wrote "Cyberchase: Castleblanca Quest isn't nearly as good as Cyberchase: Carnival Chaos".
