= Matthew Costello =

American writer (born 1948)

- Born: Matthew John Costello; 1948 (age 77–78)
- Occupations: Novelist; scriptwriter; game designer
- Writing career
- Genres: Horror fiction; gothic fiction; science fiction
- Website: www.mattcostello.com

Matthew John Costello (born 1948) is an Irish-American writer specializing in the genres of horror, gothic, and science fiction. His articles have appeared in publications including the Los Angeles Times and Sports Illustrated. He has scripted Trilobyte's bestselling CD-ROM interactive dramas The 7th Guest and its sequel The 11th Hour, as well as many other video games.

== Career ==
Costello continued Dana Lombardy's "Gaming" column on Asimov's Science Fiction beginning in April 1986, which renamed to "Neat Stuff" in April 1989 and he continued until June 1990; he also continued Lombardy's "On Gaming" column in Analog Science Fiction and Fact from May 1986 to February 1989.

Along with F. Paul Wilson, Costello created and scripted FTL Newsfeed, which ran daily on the Sci-Fi Channel from 1992 to 1996. In 2005 his novel Beneath Still Waters was adapted into a film by director Brian Yuzna.

Costello also wrote Island of the Skull (Pocket Books), an original prequel to Peter Jackson's film, King Kong.

Along with his adult genres, he has created works for children. His works include the book series The Kids of Einstein Elementary (Scholastic), and Magic Everywhere (Random House), as well as games including Aladdin's Mathquest (Disney), A Cartoon History of the Universe (Putnam), and two math games based on the hit PBS Kids show Cyberchase. He is the designer of role-playing and board games, including Dungeons & Dragons, Call of Cthulhu, Batman, Lone Wolf & Cub, and many others.

Recently, Costello worked on Rage, a post-apocalyptic action-adventure game for id Software, and wrote its novelization, as well as a new game for Eidos with Neil Richards and Swedish developer Avalanche Studios.

== Books ==
Genre	Titles	Year(s)
Anthology	52 anthologies: Cat Crimes III, “Where's Mittens?,” Donald I. Fine, Inc., 1992; Chilled to the Bone, “Undertow,” Mayfair Games, Inc., 1991; Dark Dreams, Matt Costello Horror Writer Profile, Cemetery Dance Publications, 2001; Dark Thoughts On Writing: Advice and Commentary from 50 Masters of Fear and Suspense, Underwood Books, 1997; David Copperfield's Tales of the Impossible, “The Last Vanish,” HarperCollins, 1995, 1996; Day One, “Day One,” Tor Books, 2011; Deathport, “Thank You for Your Patience,” Pocket Books, 1993; Diagnosis: Terminal, “Friendly Wager,” Tor Books, 1996, 1997; Doomslayers: Into the Labyrinth, “Expedition,” White Wolf Publishing, Inc., 1998; Dracula: Prince of Darkness, “Deep Sleep,” DAW, 1992; Frankenstein: The Monster Wakes, “My Coney Island Baby,” DAW, 1993; Future Net, “Someone Who Understands Me,” DAW, 1996; Gauntlet 2, “Nonfiction Reviews,” Borderlands Press, 1991; Gothic Ghosts, “Unexpected Attraction,” Tor Books, 1997, Great Writers & Kids Write Spooky Stories, “Closet Monsters,” (with Nora Costello) Random House, 1995; Hellboy: Odd Jobs, “A Night at the Beach,” Dark Horse Comics, Inc., 1999; Horrible Beginnings, “Deep Sleep,” DAW, 2003; Hottest Blood, “Abuse,” Pocket Books, 1993; Lighthouse Hauntings, “And the Sea Shall Claim Them” (with Rick Hautala as by A. J. Matthews), Down East Books, 2002, 2014; My Favorite Fantasy Story, An Introduction to “More Spinned Against,” DAW, 2000; Mr. October: An Anthology in Memory of Rick Hautala, Volume 1, “A Guy Walks Into a Bar,” Journal/Stone 2013; Murder Most Feline: Cunning Tales of Cats and Crime, “Mr. Biggles for the Defense,” Cumberland House, 2001; Murder Most Postal: Homicidal Tales that Deliver a Message, ”Someone Who Understands Me,” Cumberland House, 2001; Necon XV, “My Coney Island Baby,” Necon Books, 1995; Necon XX, ”Unexpected Attraction,” Necon Books, 2000; Never Fear – the Tarot, “The Hanged Man,” 13Thirty Books, 2016; Now I Lay Me Down to Sleep, “Unexpected Attraction,” Necon e-Books, 2017; Occasional Demons, “And the Sea Shall Claim Them” (with Rick Hautala a.k.a. A. J. Matthews), Cemetery Dance Publications, 2010; Odd Jobs, “A Night at the Beach,” Dreamscape Media 2020; October Dreams, “The Real Darkborn,” Cemetery Dance Publications, 2014; Phantoms of the Night, “Unfortunate Obsession,” DAW, 1996; Santa Clues, “Must Be Santa!”, Signet, 1993; Sea-Cursed: Thirty Terrifying Tales of the Deep, “Deep Sleep,” Barnes & Noble Books; Solved, “Shadow,” Carroll & Graff Publisher, Inc., 1991; Starfall, “Mind over Matter,” TSR, Inc., 1999; The Best of Cemetery Dance, “Vacation,” Cemetery Dance Publications, 1998; The Best of Cemetery Dance Volume 2, “Vacation,” New American Library, 2001; World of Darkness, Vampire: The Masquerade, “Undercover,” White Wolf, Inc., 1994; The Big Book of Necon, “Unexpected Attraction,” Cemetery Dance Publications, 2009; The Big Book of Necon, “Unexpected Attraction,” Cemetery Dance Publications, 2011; The Dean Koontz Companion, “Films, Television, and Dean Koontz,” Berkeley Books, 1994; The Essential Dracula, Commentary and Insights, Penguin Books, 1991; The Essential Frankenstein, Commentary and Insights, Penguin Books, 1993; The Fantastic Adventures of Robin Hood, “Young Robin,” Signet, 1991; The Stories: Five Years of Original Fiction on Tor.com, “Day One,” Tor, 2013; The Ultimate Zombie, “Corporate Takeover,” Dell Publishing, 1993; Thunder's Shadow, “The Man Who Knew Things,” Thunder's Shadow, 1993; Till Death Do Us Part, “Whatever Turns You On,” Berkeley Books, 1999; Time Gate: Dangerous Interfaces, “The Murderer,” Simon & Schuster, 1990; Uncharted Worlds: Xeno Encounters, “The Last Vanish,” 13Thirty Books, 2016; Unfortunate Obsession / School for the Unspeakable? Stellar Audio, 1997; Werewolves, “Nick of Time,” DAW, 1995; Writing Horror, “Pushing the Horror Button,” Writer's Digest Books, 1997	1991–2017
Chapbook	1 chapbook: Day One, Tor Books	2011
Children's literature	3 children's titles: The Kids of Einstein Elementary: The Titanic Cat, Scholastic Books, 2004 (w/Len Mlodinow); The Kids of Einstein Elementary: The Last Dinosaur, Scholastic Books, 2004 (w/Len Mlodinow); Magic Everywhere, Three Rivers Press, 1999	1999–2004
Comic books	6 comic books: Terry Gilliam's The Adventures of Baron Munchausen (4 Part Mini-Series), NOW COMICS, 1989; Fright Night Part II, NOW COMICS, 1988; Open Space No. 3, Marvel Comics, 1990	1991–1998
Cozy mystery series: Cherringham Mysteries (with Neil Richards)	48 Cherringham mysteries: The Body in the Woods, 2017; Murder on the Thames, 2013; Mystery at the Manor, 2014; Murder by Moonlight, 2014; Thick as Thieves, 2014; Last Train to London, 2014; The Curse of Mabb's Farm, 2014; The Body in the Lake, 2014; Snowblind, (2014); Playing Dead (2014); A Deadly Confession, 2014; Blade in the Water, 2014; Death on a Summer Night, 2014; A Lesson in Murder, 2015; The Secret of Combe Castle, 2015; A Fatal Fall, 2015; The Last Puzzle, 2015; Final Cut, 2015; The Vanishing Tourist, 2015; Follow the Money, 2015; Ghost of a Chance, 2015; Murder Most Wild, 2015; The Song Never Dies, 2015; Dead in the Water, 2016; A Bad Lie, 2016; A Death in the Family, 2016; Secret Santa, 2016; Death on a Moonlit Night, 2017; A Dinner to Die For, 2018; The Drowned Man, 2018; The Gentleman Vanishes, 2018; Trail of Lies, 2018; Death Trap, 2018; Cliffhanger, 2019; The Secret of Brimley Manor, 2019; Too Many Lies, 2019; Murder Under the Sun, 2020; Killing Time, 2020; Still Dead, 2020; Killer Track, 2021; Cold Case, 2021; No Place to Hide, 2022; In the Frame, 2022; A Score to Settle, 2022; Deadline, 2023; Bad Neighbours, 2023; In Good Faith, 2024	2013–2024
Cozy mystery series: Mydworth Mysteries (with Neil Richards)	16 Mydworth mysteries: A Shot in the Dark, 2019; A Little Night Murder, 2019; London Calling!, 2019; Murder Wore a Mask, 2020; Deadly Cargo, 2020; Danger in the Air, 2020; The Wrong Man, 2021; Secrets on the Côte d'Azur, 2021; A Distant Voice, 2021; City Heat, 2021; Fool's Gold, 2022; Murder in the Dark, 2022; A Deadly Match, 2023; Dead of Night, 2023; A Fatal Affair, 2023; The Lost Man, 2024	2019–2024
Fantasy & science fiction	13 fantasy / sci-fi novels: Fates Trick, Tor Books, 1988; Revolt on Majipoor, Tor Books, 1987; King Kong: The Island of the Skull, Pocket Books, 2005; Masque (F. Paul Wilson and Matthew J. Costello), Warner Books, 1998; Mirage (F. Paul Wilson and Matthew J. Costello), Warner Warner Books, 1996; Nowhere (Shane Christopher), Berkeley Books, 2007; Rage, Ballantine, 2011; seaQuest DSV: Fire Below, Berkeley Books, 1994; Star Road (Matthew Costello and Rick Hautala), St. Martin's Press, 2014; The Wizard of Tizare, Bantam Books, 1990; Time Warrior: Time of the Fox, Penguin Books, 1990; Time Warrior #2: Hour of the Scorpion, Penguin Books, 1991; Time Warrior #3: Day of the Snake, Penguin Books, 1992	1969–1971
Horror fiction	20 horror novels: Beneath Still Waters, (as Matthew J. Costello), Berkeley Books, 1989, re-released in 2007; Child's Play 2, (as Matthew J. Costello), Berkeley Books, 1990; Child's Play 3, (as Matthew J. Costello), Berkeley Books, 1991; Doom 3: Maelstrom, Pocket Books, 2009; Doom 3: Worlds on Fire, Pocket Books, 2008; Darkborn, (as Matthew J. Costello,) Berkeley Books, 1992; Drowned Night, (as Chris Blaine), Berkeley Books, 2005; In Dreams, (as Shane Christopher), Berkeley Books, 2006; Midsummer, Berkeley Books, 1990; Missing Monday, Berkeley Books, 2004; Poltergeist the Legacy: Maelstrom, Ace Books, 2000; Sleep Tight (as Matthew J. Costello). New York: Kensington Pub Corp; Zebra Books, 1987; The 7th Guest: A Novel, (with Craig Shaw Gardner), Prima Books, 1995; Wurm, Berkeley Books, 1991; Garden, Twilight Publishing, 1993; Vacation, St. Martin's Press, 2011; Vacation Limited Edition, Cemetery Dance Publications, 2016; Home, Thomas Dunne Books/St. Martin's Press, 2012; Home Limited Edition, Cemetery Dance Publications, 2012; Family, 13Thirty Books, 2017	1987–2017
Nonfiction	5 nonfiction books: How to Write Science Fiction, (1st edition) Paragon House, 1992; How to Write Science Fiction, (2nd edition) Marlow & Company, 1995; The Greatest Games of All Time, John Wiley & Sons, Inc., 1991; The Greatest Puzzles of All Time, (1st edition) Prentice Hall Press, 1988; The Greatest Puzzles of All Time, (2nd edition) Dover Books, 1996	1991–1998
Role-playing and board games	8 RPG and board games: Alone Against the Dark – 1985, (new edition 2018) for Chaosium's Call of Cthulhu; Final Challenge – Mayfair Games, for D&D, 1984 (note – link to wiki page); Marvel Super Heroes Adventure Gamebook: Daredevil Guilt by Association– for TSR and Marvel, 1988; Jonah Hex – for DC Heroes,1986; Lone Wolf and Cub – for Mayfair Games, 1989 (board game); Sniper Adventure Gamebook: KGB Doublecross, 1987; The Stauf Mysteries, 2019 (The 7th Guest board game, publisher Trilobyte); Wheel of Destruction – Batman, for DC Heroes, 1985	1984–2018
Suspense	4 suspense novels: Artifact, Tor Books, 2003 (with Kevin J. Anderson, Janet Berliner, and F. Paul Wilson); Homecoming, Berkeley Books, 1992; See How She Runs, Berkeley Books, 1994; Murder on Demand, Blackstone Press, 2024 (with Al Roker)	1992–2024

== Video games ==
Title	Publisher	Release
Bad Boys II (Bad Boys: Miami Takedown)	Empire Interactive	2004
Barbie's Riding Club	Mattel Media	1998
Clifford The Big Red Dog: Reading (with Leonard Mlodinow)	Scholastic	2000
Clue Chronicles: Fatal Illusion	Atari Interactive (formerly Hasbro Interactive)	1999
Cyberchase: Castleblanca Quest	The Learning Company	2003
Cyberchase: Carnival Chaos	The Learning Company	2003
Cyberchase: Online Adventure	PBS	2003
Derelict (with F. Paul Wilson)	Syfy (formerly Sci-Fi Channel)	1996
Disney G Force	Disney Interactive Studios	2009
Disney Universe	Disney Interactive Studios	2011
Disney's Hercules	Disney Interactive	1998
Disney's Math Quest (with F. Paul Wilson)	Disney Interactive (Aladdin (franchise))	1998
Doom 3	id software / Activision	2004
Doom 3: BFG Edition	id software / Activision	2012
Doom 3: Resurrection of Evil	id software / Activision	2005
Double Happy: The Infinite Sadness	Monkeystack	2013
Just Cause (with Neil Richards)	Eidos Interactive	2006
Just Cause 2 (with Neil Richards)	Square Enix	2010
Pirates of the Caribbean: At World's End (video game)	Disney Interactive Studios	2007
Planet of the Apes: Last Frontier (with Neil Richards)	PlayStation	2017
Quake Champions	Bethesda Softworks	2017
Rage	Bethesda Softworks	2011
Resident Evil 4 (2023 video game)	Capcom	2023
Resident Evil 4: Separate Ways	Capcom	2023
Shellshock: Nam '67	Eidos Interactive	2004
Starsky & Hutch	Empire Interactive	2003
The 7th Guest	Virgin Interactive Entertainment (formerly Virgin Games)	1993
The 7th Guest VR (based on original story by)	Vertigo Studios and Exkee	2023
The 11th Hour	Virgin Interactive Entertainment (formerly Virgin Games)	1995
The Cartoon History of the Universe	Putnam New Media	1995
The Italian Job	Eidos Interactive	2003
The Walking Dead: No Man's Land	Next Games	2015

== Awards ==
- Bram Stoker Award for Best Novel nominee (1993): Homecoming
- Prometheus Award Best Novel nominee (1999): Masque
