= Trilobyte =

American video game developer

Trilobyte Games, LLC
- Industry: Video games
- Founded: February 1, 1991; 35 years ago in Jacksonville, Oregon, US
- Founders: Graeme Devine; Rob Landeros
- Headquarters: Medford, Oregon, US
- Key people: Rob Landeros (CEO); Charlie McHenry (COO)
- Products: The 7th Guest, The 11th Hour
- Website: trilobytegames.com

Trilobyte Games, LLC (formerly Trilobyte, Inc.) is an American video game developer based in Medford, Oregon. The company was founded in February 1991 by Graeme Devine and Rob Landeros, who had been fired from Virgin Games after pitching their idea for The 7th Guest. They developed the game as Trilobyte and followed it up with The 11th Hour. Following a string of less successful titles and cancellations, the company shut down in February 1999. In 2010, Landeros resurrected the name under Trilobyte Games.

== History ==
Graeme Devine and Rob Landeros founded Trilobyte on February 1, 1991, after being fired from Virgin Interactive. They established the first office in the second floor above J'Ville Tavern in Jacksonville, Oregon.

=== The 7th Guest ===
The 7th Guest was one of the first computer games for CD-ROM. Most of the footage for the game was filmed with a US$35,000 budget, Super VHS cameras, and blue butcher paper as a background that would later be removed using chromakey to insert the actors in the game. In the game, the player must move around the map solving puzzles in a style similar to Myst. Most of the puzzles in The 7th Guest were based on versions of pre-existing puzzles invented by people such as Max Bezzel. The 7th Guest was the first game to use full rendered 3D animation and navigation. For the time, it had state-of-the-art graphics by Rob Landeros, Robert Stein III, Gene Bodio, Alan Iglesias, MIDI music by The Fat Man, and a story by Matthew J. Costello. During planning, a sequel was being considered. The final version of The 7th Guest was released in April 1993, with 60,000 copies sold overnight.

The game was a turning point in CD-ROM based technology. Bill Gates called The 7th Guest "the new standard in interactive entertainment."

=== The 11th Hour ===
The 11th Hour was released in the winter of 1995, after missing its original release date by more than a year. It was one of the first games to support 16-bit color, with detailed environments and fluid motion. However, the game drew criticism for several reasons:

- The game was released in DOS when Windows 95 was dominant in the market
- The game still used MIDI for music, instead of CD audio.
- Gameplay featuring puzzles and riddles, which ranged from abstract logic to anagrams.

Despite pre-orders, sales did not meet the expected amount, and the game did not recover its production costs. This was a key factor in the company's financial downfall.

=== Subsequent projects ===
The next projects for Trilobyte were published by Trilobyte itself. Clandestiny, with gameplay similar to the previous The 7th Guest, and The 11th Hour, though using cel animated (cartoon) video rather than live action, and Uncle Henry's Playhouse, a re-packaging of a number of the puzzles and games from The 7th Guest, The 11th Hour, and Clandestiny. Neither were commercially successful.

It has been reported that the relationship between Landeros and Devine became so strained that they last spoke to each other at a board meeting in November 1996.

After Clandestiny, the company effectively took two different internal directions. Landeros led a project called Tender Loving Care, while Devine started a Massively Multiplayer project, Millennium. Tender Loving Care, starring John Hurt, was completed in 1998.

About the same time, Red Orb Entertainment, a division of Broderbund, signed on to publish two titles on Devine's "side" of the company – Assault!, a top-down multiplayer action game, and Extreme Racing, a racing game, which ran on a shared game engine. Assault! was later renamed Extreme Warfare and changed from top-down to a first person perspective. Extreme Racing was retitled Baja 1000 Racing and attached to a SCORE International racing license. Both games made appearances at the Electronic Entertainment Expo (E3) trade show that year.

=== Closing ===
In June 1998, The Learning Company acquired Broderbund. The Learning Company was not interested in any kind of online games and thus canceled Trilobyte's by September. Unable to find another publisher for its projects, the company cut payroll on September 15, 1998. Publishers like Electronic Arts and especially Midway Games were interested in acquiring the company. By December, Trilobyte was close to reaching an agreement with Midway and Devine unsuccessfully sought funding from Paul Allen to keep the company afloat until it was finalized. However, the publisher stopped calling at the end of the month and, in January 1999, the company was being evicted. Trilobyte had its last day of operations on February 2, 1999. Devine took up a job at id Software and led the design of Quake III Arena. Other staffers were hired by the nascent local company N'Lightning Software Development to develop Catechumen.

=== Relaunch ===
In November 2010, Trilobyte was resurrected. The 7th Guest was relaunched for the iPhone and iPad in December 2010. In April 2011, The 7th Guest: Infection—a stand-alone version of the popular Microscope Puzzle from the original 7th Guest—was released for iPad.

=== The 7th Guest 3 ===
On Halloween 2013, Trilobyte launched a Kickstarter campaign for The 7th Guest 3: The Collector, which failed to meet its funding target of $435,000. Another crowdfunding campaign was started at Crowdtilt with a smaller goal of $65,000 to build the first story of the haunted mansion but that too, failed, and the 7th Guest 3 was officially cancelled in June 2014.

== Released games ==
- The 7th Guest – the first title released by Trilobyte Software. It sold over 2 million copies, making more than US$50 million for the company in the 1990s. It was re-released for iPhone and iPad in December 2010, and re-released for PC by DotEmu in February 2012 as an updated version. It was also re-released for PC by GOG in a smaller package. On 13 March 2012 The 7th Guest for MacIntosh was released on the Mac App Store.
- The 11th Hour – the sequel to The 7th Guest. Many production problems and release date slipped by a year resulted in lost profits and sales of 1.7 million units. This game was also re-released in February 2012 for PC by both DotEmu and GOG.
- Clandestiny – a cel animated child-friendly puzzle game. It sold only 2,500 copies in the United States, bringing in a profit of just US$500,000. The game is currently available in the Mac App Store and published by GRL Games.
- Uncle Henry's Playhouse – a compilation of some of the puzzles from The 7th Guest, The 11th Hour, and Clandestiny. It sold 27 copies in the United States, and 127 worldwide.
- The 7th Guest: Infection – a stand-alone version of the Microscope Puzzle from the original release of The 7th Guest, which was excluded from the re-released iPhone and iPad versions due to technical issues. Released as an app for iPad in April 2011.

== Unreleased games ==
- Cybernet – The Fat Man has listed on his website that he composed the music for this game.
- Dog Eat Dog – An office politics simulator. At a cost of over US$800,000, it was scrapped halfway through production.
- The 7th Guest III – A game where the house would be back to its original form and all forms of media were to be controlled by Satan. US$500,000 went into production. Only a few highly rendered screen shots were created before the project was cancelled.
- Extreme Warfare – Graeme Devine's online top-down perspective 3D tank game, originally named Assault. Red Orb Entertainment was sold to The Learning Company, who cancelled the game.
- Baja Racing – originally called Extreme Racing. It was shelved due to the lack of development personnel.
- The 13th Soul – a 3rd-person real time game inside the Stauf mansion. A few rendered rooms were made. The sale of Virgin Interactive resulted in the cancellation of the project.
- Trojan Planet – a role-playing game set in a parallel universe where all the world is Troy. The company went under shortly after the concept arose.
- The 7th Guest III (3rd Version) – Another version in which the town was abandoned and Tad (the young boy from the 7th Guest) was grown up and a writer, coming back to stop Stauf. The company went under shortly after the concept arose.
- The 7th Guest III: The Collector – A completely new version of 7th Guest III where the events took place in a German museum rather than the Stauf house. Lack of funding and interest by the producer Lunny Interactive caused it to be shelved. Trilobyte later sought crowdfunding for a different concept bearing a similar title, but it was cancelled in June 2014.
