= Rob Landeros =

American video game designer

- Rob Landeros in 2010
- Born: Redlands, California
- Occupation: Game designer
- Known for: The 7th Guest

Rob Landeros is an American computer game designer and graphic artist. Together with Graeme Devine, he co-founded Trilobyte, where he created the highly commercially successful games The 7th Guest and The 11th Hour. After leaving Trilobyte, he co-founded Aftermath Media, where he released the interactive movies Tender Loving Care and Point of View.

== Biography ==
Landeros was born and raised in Redlands, California. Prior to becoming involved in the computer gaming industry, he worked as an artist in more traditional media between the late 1960s and early 1980s. Amongst other art forms, he drew underground comics and carved scrimshaw.

Landeros began his career in computer games in the late 1980s, first working as the Art Director for Cinemaware, where he worked on games such as Defender of the Crown and S.D.I.. In 1991 he began working at Virgin Games, where he would meet Graeme Devine, with whom he would partner to form Trilobyte. Landeros and Devine enjoyed success at Trilobyte with their groundbreaking CD-ROM game The 7th Guest, which sold over 2 million copies. Bill Gates called The 7th Guest "the new standard in interactive entertainment."

After leaving Trilobyte, Landeros co-founded Aftermath Media. In 1999, the company released the interactive movie Tender Loving Care. It was followed in 2001 by P.O.V.: Point of View. On April 17, 2001, four chapters of Point of View were streamed over the Internet to promote the DVD.

Landeros currently runs his own graphic design business. In 2010 he re-launched Trilobyte who are working on re-releasing versions of its classic games, including The 7th Guest, The 11th Hour, for use on iPhone and iPad. The company is also working on new titles for these devices.
