= Cyberchase: Castleblanca Quest =

2003 educational video game

- Developer: Basis Applied Technology
- Publisher: The Learning Company
- Series: Cyberchase
- Platforms: Windows macOS
- Release: 2003
- Genre: Edutainment

Cyberchase: Castleblanca Quest is a computer game developed by Canadian studio Basis Applied Technology and published by The Learning Company and based on the Cyberchase edutainment TV series. The game was released in 2003.

== Summary ==
The game's features include: eight activities, video footage and full screen animation, a "tracking feature" that lets parents monitor progress, adventure and practice modes, and three levels of difficulty.

== Critical reception ==
USA Today wrote "Cyberchase Castleblanca Quest isn't nearly as good as Cyberchase Carnival Chaos", adding "The story line in Cyberchase Castleblanca Quest is difficult to follow. It is presented in a very grainy video that is too brief". Common Sense Media gave the game a rating of 2/5 stars, writing "Parents need to know that a hard-to-follow storyline and inadequate directions make this software difficult to play". Techwithkids gave the game 3/5 stars, writing "If you have Cyberchase fans, play Cyberchase Carnival Chaos and skip this one".
