= The 11th Hour (video game) =

1995 video game

- Developer: Trilobyte
- Publisher: Virgin Interactive Entertainment
- Producer: James Yokota
- Designers: Rob Landeros; Graeme Devine
- Programmer: Graeme Devine
- Artists: Robert Stein III; Rob Landeros
- Writers: Matthew Costello; David Wheeler
- Composer: George Sanger
- Platforms: DOS, Windows, Mac OS
- Release: DOS/Windows: NA: November 30, 1995; EU: December 1995; Mac OS: NA: July 31, 1998
- Genres: Interactive movie, puzzle adventure
- Mode: Single-player

The 11th Hour is a 1995 interactive movie puzzle adventure game with a horror setting. It is the sequel to the 1993 game The 7th Guest. A 3DO Interactive Multiplayer version was planned but never released.

== Plot ==
The narrative begins 70 years after The 7th Guest's events. The year is 1995, and the player is Carl Denning, a "Case Unsolved" television series investigative reporter. Robin Morales, his producer and lover, mysteriously vanished three weeks prior in Harley-on-the-Hudson, New York. She was investigating a series of grisly murders and disappearances that had plagued the otherwise sleepy upstate town over the last few months. Denning's only solid lead is a portable computer called the GameBook delivered with only a postmark from Harley. When booted, the GameBook displays Robin's plea to help her escape.

The story then flashes back to the beginning of Robin's investigation. She interviews Eileen Wiley, the only person known to have survived an encounter with Henry Stauf's mansion. Eileen confirms she lost her hand that night, claiming it had been bitten off by a dog, but offers no other meaningful details of the encounter.

Suspicious of Eileen's story, Robin interviews Dr. Thornton, who treated Eileen that night. Though the doctor appears to believe Eileen about the dog, the interview proves fruitful as Dr. Thornton reveals that Eileen was not alone that night; her friend Samantha Ford was with her in the house those 18 years ago. Samantha's family used its considerable influence to keep her involvement out of the papers. He also reveals that Samantha has been paralyzed from the waist down ever since the girls' encounter. Dr. Thornton's receptionist listens to the entire conversation through an intercom, demonstrating a strangely angry behavior.

Robin attempts to interview Samantha, but their meeting is adversarial. Samantha's forceful denials convince Robin that the women are not telling the truth about their encounter. Samantha confirms Robin's suspicions later that evening when she visits Robin's motel room and shares her story. Samantha claims that during their encounter with the house, something supernatural held the girls down and raped them. He then let them go, though the gate slammed shut on Eileen's hand as she tried to flee, severing it. After both women ended up pregnant, Samantha had an illegal abortion that resulted in her paralysis, but Eileen went through with the pregnancy and had a daughter, Marie. Samantha claims there was always something sinister about the child and believes that "all hell let loose" around Marie's 18th birthday, that Marie is the mansion's offspring, and that Marie is responsible for the murders and disappearances. Meanwhile, Robin begins a romance with Jim Martin, the local police chief.

Robin confronts Eileen with the story, and Eileen denies everything. Eileen then challenges Robin to go to the house herself. After Robin leaves it is revealed that Marie, who is Dr. Thornton's receptionist, was listening to the entire conversation again. Desperate to keep her secret from getting out, Marie commands her lover Chuck Lynch to murder Robin. It is revealed that Chuck and Marie were responsible for the recent murder spree: from time to time, at Marie's orders, Chuck would kill an innocent victim as a human sacrifice to "feed" the entity that inhabits Stauf's mansion. It is implied that Chuck, who is an adulterous businessman, was getting benefits magically from the entity in exchange for the sacrifices. Chuck initially resists murdering Robin, worried about the media attention a famous disappearance would bring, but Marie convinces him by reminding him of the consequences for not helping Stauf. He enters Robin's hotel and stabs someone sleeping in bed, but he actually stabbed the police chief who had a budding romance with Robin. Unable to remove the knife, he takes the body to Stauf's mansion, where he is pulled inside and killed by Stauf for his mistake. Robin comes to the house soon after and enters as Samantha watches remotely, somehow having hacked into Stauf's surveillance. As Robin moves through the house, it psychologically breaks her by systematically confronting her with uncomfortable truths about her past.

The story then picks up with Carl in the mansion. Eventually Robin meets Stauf and he begins to tempt her into joining him, by enticing her with her own television network and other advantages she can get by serving the entity. Carl watches the conversation between them through the GameBook and unsuccessfully tries to convince Robin to just leave the mansion with him. As Robin ignores Carl's pleas and accepts Stauf's offer, Samantha breaks into the GameBook transmission and reveals that she was the one who sent the GameBook to Carl hoping that he could rescue Robin and warns him that it is too late now. Unable to leave Robin at first, Carl follows her cries upstairs where he meets Stauf, who is presiding over a game show called "Let’s Make a Real Deal" (a parody of Let's Make a Deal). Stauf explains that Carl must choose to open one of the doors, then offers Carl $600. Carl can keep it, or he can pay $200 and reveal what's behind one of the three doors in front of him. He pays to reveal door number two, which turns out to be a large TV. Next, he pays door number one, which is Marie. As Stauf tempts Carl with Marie's sexual prowess, Samantha hacks into the TV behind door number two, warning him not to give in to temptation as Stauf mocks her paralysis. Finally, Carl pays to reveal door number three, which is Robin. She expresses her love for Carl, pleading with him to choose her. Samantha urges Carl to choose the TV, revealing that this will end Stauf forever and that choosing either of the others will doom him. The game turns Carl's choice over to the player, which reveals one of three endings:

- Carl chooses Samantha: On the moment Carl touches the TV screen, he is teleported to Samantha's front door, and they watch the house burn to the ground on the same TV from the game show. Carl expresses regret about Robin, but Samantha laments that Robin was lost the moment she said "yes" to Stauf. Apparently, in this ending, the entity starved to death when Carl refused its offers and chose to just save himself.
- Carl chooses Robin: Carl and Robin embrace as Samantha looks on in disappointment. The story then flashes forward weeks later, where Robin is in Carl's living room watching the news of his body being found in the Hudson River. The newscaster reports that he disappeared on his honeymoon in Harley-on-the-Hudson after marrying Robin, who is the new president of the Stauf Broadcasting System. It's possible that in this ending Robin took Chuck's former place as the "mansion feeder", and murdered Carl both as a sacrifice and to silence him after all he had witnessed inside of the mansion.
- Carl chooses Marie: As Samantha and Robin look on, Carl gives in to Marie's temptations. Marie leads him through a door to another room, and as the two have sex, Marie morphs into Stauf. The Stauf/Marie hybrid then taunts Carl ironically congratulating him for his "wise choice" while eating cooked ribs, which they claim to be his. On the script of the game, after morphing into Stauf, Marie was supposed to morph into the entity that controls the mansion revealing its physical appearance, but it was scrapped from the final version of the game.

== Gameplay ==
Overall, the gameplay is similar to its predecessor's with the same puzzle-based gameplay structure, but with the additional element of a treasure hunt.

== Release ==
Although Trilobyte stated in 1993 — even before The 7th Guest became available — that it planned to release The 11th Hour by October of that year, it was very late to market by over two years (eventually releasing at the end of November 1995) and failed to meet sales expectations upon its release. Early into its development, a port to the 3DO was planned, and a release date of May 1994 was announced, but it was pushed back to March 1995, and ultimately cancelled. It was also slated for release for the PlayStation in late 1994.

Trilobyte intended to release the game on both the iPhone and iPad platforms. The release for iOS was scheduled for Q2/Q3 2011, but in March 2012 Trilobyte postponed the release indefinitely due to "serious technical challenges".

In April 2012, The 7th Guest: Book of Secrets application for iOS was renamed to just Book of Secrets, and was updated to include a walkthrough and script for The 11th Hour, just as it already had for 7th Guest.

In 2012, The 11th Hour was re-released for Windows, as a download from DotEmu and GOG.com. It was re-released again on Steam in October 2013, as part of a collaboration between Trilobyte and Night Dive Studios.

== Development ==
The makers of the game originally intended for it to contain more adult content in its cut scenes; the script for the game (published as part of a walk-through guide) included several R-rated sex scenes. Rumors immediately surfaced that an "uncut" version of 11th Hour existed, leading to the game makers announcing that the R-rated sequences, though planned, were never filmed.

Many of the videos that were filmed for the game used location shooting; the fifth scene utilised a blue screen incorporating a neutral blue drape. Macintosh Premier was used to convert the capture film into digitized images and videos. A program called 'Wavelet' was used to compress the game's videos.

It was developed by Trilobyte and used a later version of the Groovie graphic engine than that used by The 7th Guest. The 11th Hour also features the music of George "The Fat Man" Sanger and Team Fat.

== Reception ==
Reception

Review scores
Publication	Score
AllGame	1.5/5 (3DO); 1.5/5 (PC); 1.5/5 (MAC)
Computer Gaming World	3/5
Next Generation	2/5
PC Gamer (US)	76%
Maximum	3/5
PC Magazine	3/4
Computer Games Strategy Plus	4/5
PC Games	4/5
GameSpot	5/10
Computer Game Review	84/70/79

Reviews of the game upon initial release were mixed. After extensively praising the game's graphics, challenging puzzles, storyline, and atmosphere, as well as the lower amount of gratuitous gore when compared to The 7th Guest, a reviewer for Maximum concluded: "However, the bottom line is that 11th Hour is basically a more advanced version of 7th Guest". A reviewer for Next Generation also found the game much too similar to its predecessor, particularly as he considered the entire genre of puzzle adventures to be a waste of time. He also criticized that the game has long load times except when running on high-end computers. Steve Honeywell of Computer Game Review called it a "whopping disappointment". Arinn Dembo reviewed the game for Computer Gaming World. In 2010, UGO included the game in the article The 11 Weirdest Game Endings.

By April 1995, Trilobyte planned to launch The 11th Hour with a shipment of 250,000 copies. However, by December, retailers in the United States had ordered 500,000 units of the game. According to Geoff Keighley, "The 11th Hour had the biggest ship-out of a PC game up until that point - nearly half a million units". The game was a commercial success, with sales of nearly 300,000 copies in the United States alone by May 1996.

=== Awards ===
The 11th Hour won the following awards:

- 1995 New Media Invision Awards - Gold-Games Strategy/Puzzle
- 1995 New Media Invision Awards - Bronze-Consumer Interactive Movies
- 1995 International Cindy Competition - Honorable Mention - Consumer Games
- 1995 CD-ROM Today "Rommie" Awards - Best Graphic Adventure
