= Graeme Devine =

Scottish game designer and programmer

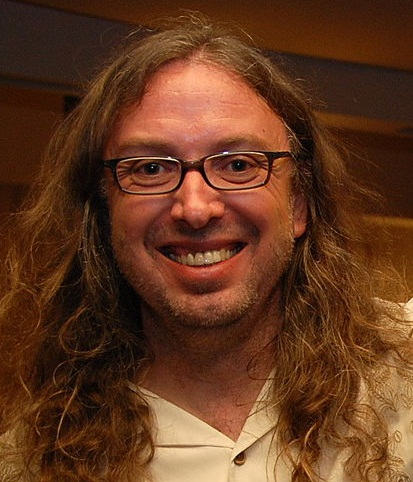
- At TouchArcade WWDC Party in 2010
- Born: 1966 (age 59–60); Glasgow, Scotland
- Other name: Graeme John Devine
- Occupation: Creative Technical Officer at QXR Studios
- Known for: The 7th Guest; Quake III Arena
- Spouse: Lori Johnson Devine (1 child)

Graeme Devine is a computer game designer and programmer who co-founded Trilobyte, created bestselling games The 7th Guest and The 11th Hour, and helped design id Software's Quake III Arena. He was Chairman of the International Game Developers Association (IGDA) from 2002 to 2003. One of Graeme's trademarks is his Scooby-Doo wardrobe. He has said of his work that "I've not stuck to any one genre, platform or IP throughout my career, and I hope people eventually work out that's just fine."

== Biography ==
Devine was born in 1966 in Glasgow, Scotland and began his career working on the TRS-80 at age 14 in the late 1970s. His first games were published by Softek Software for the ZX Spectrum. He joined Atari, Inc. at age 16 to port their classic game Pole Position to the Commodore 64, Apple, and ZX Spectrum. He also worked for Lucasfilm's Games Division, Activision UK, and Virgin Interactive.

Devine founded Trilobyte in December 1990 with Rob Landeros. Together, they designed the original concept of the 1992 puzzle video game The 7th Guest. Graeme was the lead programmer on the game and on its sequel The 11th Hour. The 7th Guest sold 2 million copies, and is credited (along with the game Myst) with encouraging the use of CD-ROM drives for games.

=== id Software ===
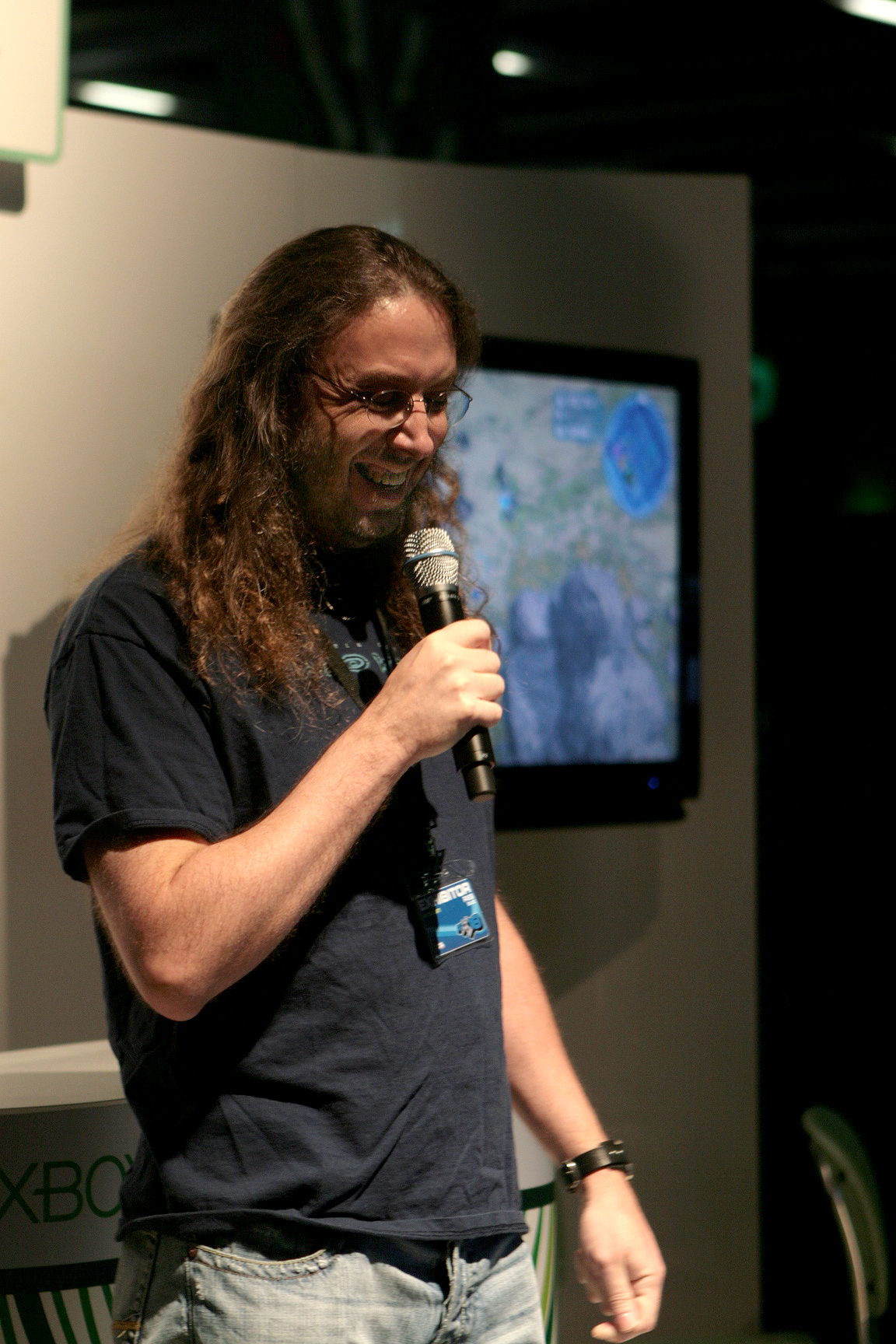
Devine demonstrating Halo Wars at Penny Arcade Expo, 2008

After the demise of Trilobyte in the late 1990s, Devine joined id Software in 1999 to work as a designer on Quake III Arena and Quake III Team Arena. At id he gained recognition in the Mac gaming community for supporting development on the platform. He also worked on the Game Boy Advance versions of Commander Keen (2001), Wolfenstein 3D, and Doom II, and was a programmer on Doom 3 until he moved to Ensemble in August 2003. Matthew J. Costello, who worked with Devine on The 7th Guest, would also help plot Doom 3 and, like 7th Guest, later novelize it. Devine then took the Lead Designer position for Halo Wars, an RTS for the Xbox 360. In February 2008 Devine was named one of the Top 100 Developers in the video game industry.

=== Apple ===
In 2009, Devine was hired by Apple Inc. He was in charge of making sure that Apple's iOS devices play games well. In December 2010, he left Apple to focus on developing games on iOS devices.

=== GRL Games ===
Devine founded GRL Games in Santa Cruz, California in 2010, focused on making games for the iPhone and iPad. According to the company's website, the GRL either stands for "Giant Robot Lizard" or "Graeme Roque Lori." GRL Games' first application, Full Deck Solitaire was released in 2011 along with Clandestiny, Full Deck Word Games, Full Deck Poker Solitaire and Solitaire Minute. GRL Games' announced Dance City on 10 March 2012.

=== Magic Leap ===
Devine was the Chief Creative Officer & Senior VP Games, Apps, and Creative Experiences at Magic Leap until his departure in 2020.
