= Kabuto (disambiguation) =

The kabuto is an armored helmet traditionally worn by samurai.

Kabuto may also refer to:

== Anime and manga ==
- Koji Kabuto, protagonist of Mazinger-Z and pilot of the titular mecha
- Karasu Tengu Kabuto, a 1986 manga and anime by Buichi Terasawa
- Kabuto Yakushi, a henchman of Naruto villain Orochimaru and later joins forces with Tobi
- Kabuto Shiro, a character in the Mazinger anime and manga series
- Kabuto Katsumi, a Tenjho Tenge character
- Kabuto, the name of Usopp's new slingshot when he becomes Sogeking in One Piece
- Carnage Kabuto, the strongest creation of the House of Evolution in One-Punch Man

== Live-action film and television ==
- Kamen Rider Kabuto, Kamen Rider television series
  - Kamen Rider Kabuto (character), a character within the above series
  - Kamen Rider Dark Kabuto, another character within the above series
- B-Fighter Kabuto, a Japanese television series
- Kabuto Raiger, a Ninpuu Sentai Hurricaneger character

== Places ==
- Kabuto Rock, a large rock projecting from the coast of Antarctica
- Mount Kabuto, a mountain in Nishinomiya, Hyōgo, Japan

== Video games ==
- Kabuto (Pokémon), a Pokémon species
- Kabuto, a boss in the Sega Master System video game Alex Kidd in Shinobi World
- The titular creature in Giants: Citizen Kabuto
- Kabuto, leader of the Taraba Ninja Clan, appearing in Shinobido: Way of the Ninja

== Other uses ==
- Japanese rhinoceros beetle, Allomyrina dichotoma, or kabutomushi (カブトムシ), a rhinoceros beetle named because of its resemblance to the kabuto helmet
- OGK Kabuto, a Japanese bicycle and motorcycle helmet company

== See also ==
- Kabuto Station (disambiguation)
