= 加太駅 =

加太駅 is the name of two train stations in Japan:

- Kabuto Station (Mie)
- Kada Station

== See also ==
- Kabuto Station (disambiguation)
