= Shinobi Rock =

Shinobi Rock (68°3′S 43°44′E) is a small rock exposure on the coast between Kabuto Rock and Rakuda Rock in Queen Maud Land. Mapped from surveys and air photos by the Japanese Antarctic Research Expedition (JARE), 1957–1962, and named Shinobi-iwa (hidden rock).
