= Rogue Rocket Games =

American video game developer

- Industry: Video games
- Founded: 2011
- Headquarters: San Francisco, California, United States
- Key people: Nick Bruty (co-founder); Rich Sun (co-founder)
- Number of employees: 1–10
- Website: RogueRocketGames.com

Rogue Rocket Games is an American video game developer formed in early 2011 by Nick Bruty and Rich Sun, both of whom previously worked at Planet Moon Studios. The company is located in San Francisco, California.

== History ==
In April 2014, Nick Bruty announced that Rogue Rocket Games was working on a spiritual sequel to Giants: Citizen Kabuto called First Wonder; its Kickstarter was launched in September 2015. Funding for this project was later canceled by the project creator on October 17, 2015.

== Games ==
The following games have been developed by Rogue Rocket Games.

Title	Release year	Genre	Platform(s)	Notes
Sushi Chop	2011	Casual game	iOS, Android, Windows Phone	
Infected	2011	Casual game	iOS, Android	
Dead On Delivery	2013	Casual game	iOS, Android, Amazon Kindle	
Gunpowder	2013	Physics game	iOS, Android, Windows 8, Google Play	
Jackpot Gems	2014	Casual game	iOS, Android	
Throne Together	2014	Physics game	Windows 8, Windows Phone	
Astrosmash	2023	Fixed shooter	Android, iOS, Windows, macOS, Nintendo Switch, Xbox One, Xbox Series X/S, PlayStation 4, PlayStation 5	
