= Savage (video game) =

1988 video game

- Developers: Probe Software (David Perry, Nick Bruty, David Whittaker)
- Publisher: Firebird Software
- Platforms: Amiga, Atari ST, MS-DOS, ZX Spectrum, Amstrad CPC, Commodore 64
- Release: 1988: C64, Spectrum; 1989: Amiga
- Genre: Action
- Mode: Single-player

Savage is an action game developed by Probe Software and published by Firebird Software in 1988 for ZX Spectrum, Commodore 64, Amstrad CPC, Atari ST, and MS-DOS. In 1989 Firebird published a version for the Amiga.

== Gameplay ==
Stage 1 (ZX Spectrum)

Savage is a three-part game; the first part is side-scrolling level with a muscular hero warrior fighting his way in a castle dungeon; the second is a 3D into-the-screen action sequence where the player has to shoot targets while avoiding monstrous stone heads; the third level a bird has to find its way in a 2d scrolling maze, collect four keys and reach the exit.

The story is a swords and sorcery fantasy, with the muscular hero in the end rescuing his 'maiden love' from the clutches of the "Dark Guardian".

== Reception ==
Nick Bruty spoke on the reception of the game stating "The reviews definitely seemed positive, but sales-wise I don't think it did that well. I hated the marketing campaign - the print ads, They had this weedy little school kid becoming Savage, and I think they really should've just focused on the game itself. So there was this big thing, 'Savage' - a colour, full-on, Conan-on-steroids game, and then we got this weedy, black and white advert. Everything about it sucked the life out of me."

Your Sinclair awarded the game 9 out of 10, praising the detailed and colourful graphics achieved with the Spectrum.

The Commodore 64/128 version of the game was reviewed in 1990 in Dragon #155 by Hartley, Patricia, and Kirk Lesser in "The Role of Computers" column. The reviewers gave the game 4 out of 5 stars. The reviewers complimented the game, stating, "Savage is one of the best C64/128 arcade games we’ve played lately. Especially of note is the game's music, which is of extraordinarily high quality. The graphic sprites are well designed, and play is fast." They concluded the review by saying, "Yes, Savage is savage—on both your joystick palm and fire-button finger. If you aren’t quick, you’re dead. [...] Savage is a very good arcade/fantasy game and is well named!"

== See also ==
- Trantor: The Last Stormtrooper
