= Nick Bruty =

British video game designer and entrepreneur (born 1969)

- Born: 1969 (age 56–57); Longfield, Kent
- Known for: Video game designer
- Notable work: Earthworm Jim, Earthworm Jim 2, MDK

Nicholas Anthony Bruty (known as Nick Bruty) is a British video game designer and entrepreneur, known for work on video games such as Earthworm Jim, Earthworm Jim 2, and MDK.

== Biography ==
=== Early career ===
Bruty was born in 1969, in Longfield, Kent, and was raised and educated in Livingston, Scotland. He made his first step into video games when he was 15, working for company SoftStone with his friend David Quinn, completing some projects before SoftStone went bust in 1984.

In 1987, Bruty joined Probe Software, where he met another notable industry figure: David Perry. Together they formed a team, with Bruty as artist and Perry as programmer, making arcade classics such as Trantor: The Last Stormtrooper, Savage, Overlord and Dan Dare 3. In 1992, Perry and Bruty both joined the American division of Virgin Games, where they worked on Global Gladiators, Cool Spot, Aladdin and The Jungle Book.

=== Shiny Entertainment ===
In 1993, David Perry formed Shiny Entertainment in California, and Bruty, along with some other members of Virgin Games, followed having completed The Jungle Book. While at Shiny, Bruty led the art direction on cult platformers Earthworm Jim and its sequel. In the Special Edition of Earthworm Jim, the level "Big Bruty" was named after him.

Shiny produced the hit shooter MDK in 1997. Bruty was responsible for the idea of the game itself, the characters, and its humorous style.

=== Planet Moon Studios ===
After MDK, Bruty left Shiny and formed video game company Planet Moon Studios with other ex-Shiny employees Tim Williams and Scott Guest. The company made Giants: Citizen Kabuto, Armed and Dangerous (influenced by MDK) and Infected. In 2011, Planet Moon closed, and the company's staff were acquired by online games developer Bigpoint Games.

=== Rogue Rocket Games ===
In March 2011 Bruty and ex-Planet Moon Studios lead programmer Richard Sun formed a new game company: Rogue Rocket Games. In March 2014, Bruty and Rogue Rocket Games announced First Wonder, a spiritual sequel to Giants: Citizen Kabuto. They started a Kickstarter crowdfunding campaign for it on September 25, 2015; however the campaign did not meet its funding target and the project was canceled.
