= Hikae Rock =

Rock exposure of 1 nautical mile in Antarctica

Hikae Rock (68°0′S 43°58′E) is a rock exposure of 1 nautical mile (2 km) along the ice coast of Antarctica, lying 1 nautical mile east of Rakuda Glacier in Queen Maud Land. It was mapped from air photos and surveys by the Japanese Antarctic Research Expedition, 1957–62, and named Hikae-iwa.
