= After Burner: Black Falcon =

2007 video game

- Developer: Planet Moon Studios
- Publisher: Sega
- Director: Ryan Kaufman
- Producer: Nate Schaumberg
- Designer: Ryan Kaufman
- Programmer: Richard Sun
- Artist: Ken Capelli
- Composers: Trans Am; Andy Greenberg
- Series: After Burner
- Platform: PlayStation Portable
- Release: NA: March 20, 2007; EU: March 30, 2007; AU: April 12, 2007
- Genres: 3D shooter, air combat simulation
- Modes: Single-player, multiplayer

After Burner: Black Falcon is a 2007 arcade-style combat flight simulation video game. It is the sixth game in the After Burner series and, unlike previous games in the series, it is exclusive to the PlayStation Portable and not a port of an arcade game.

== Overview ==
A terrorist cell dubbed Black Falcon hijacks 13 prototype "Assassin" fighter jets from the CIA. There are three different pilots to choose from, each with their own plot twists. Players oppose the terrorists in an assortment of 19 planes, including the F-14D Tomcat, the F-22 Raptor and the F-15E Strike Eagle. Each of the planes can be customized with a variety of weapons, items and custom paint jobs. The game supports "numerous multiplayer challenges" in both eight-player competitive and two-player cooperative modes.

== Reception ==
Reception

Aggregate score
Aggregator	Score
Metacritic	73/100

Review scores
Publication	Score
Edge	6/10
Electronic Gaming Monthly	4.67/10
Eurogamer	7/10
Game Informer	7.75/10
GamePro	4/5
GameSpot	7.2/10
GameZone	8/10
IGN	7.9/10
PlayStation: The Official Magazine	7/10
X-Play	4/5

The game received "average" reviews according to video game review aggregator Metacritic.
