= Armed and Dangerous (video game) =

2003 video game

- Developer: Planet Moon Studios
- Publisher: LucasArts
- Director: Tim Williams
- Producers: Aaron Loeb; Dan Pettit
- Designers: Tim Williams; Nick Bruty; Bob Stevenson
- Programmer: Scott Guest
- Artists: Nick Bruty; Bob Stevenson; Ken Capelli
- Writers: Aaron Loeb; Tim Williams
- Composer: Anna Karney
- Engine: Amityville II
- Platforms: Microsoft Windows; Xbox
- Release: NA: December 2, 2003; EU: February 27, 2004
- Genres: First-person shooter, third-person shooter
- Modes: Single-player, multiplayer (Xbox only)

Armed and Dangerous is a 2003 shooter video game created by Planet Moon Studios and released by LucasArts. It is a third-person action-adventure shooter which parodies video games and other media such as The Lord of the Rings, Star Wars, and Monty Python and the Holy Grail, using humorous in-game dialogue and cutscenes. The game features known actors and voice actors such as Brian George as main hero Roman, Jeff Bennett, John Mariano and Pat Fraley as his sidekicks Jonesy, Rexus and Q (respectively) and Tony Jay as villain King Forge.

== Gameplay ==
Armed and Dangerous is a third-person shooter action game, the camera hovering behind Roman, the player character, at all times. The game is played mostly on foot, with most levels incorporating usable gun emplacements, although there are some base defense levels where the player is inside a movable gun turret mounted on rails on top of a defensive wall; these levels are played in first-person.

Playable weaponry and equipment in the game is a mix of shooter staples, including bolt-action and sniper rifles, submachine guns and rocket launchers, but also more unusual fare like the 'Land Shark Gun', which fires into the ground a rapidly maturing infant Land Shark, a creature that 'swims' through the earth, seeking out and devouring enemies. Other unusual devices include a miniature black hole, a gas grenade that turns enemies against each other, and a device that temporarily reverses gravity, causing enemies to 'fall' into the sky and literally turning the world upside-down before the device shuts down, returning gravity to normal and returning affected enemies to earth, killing them by the fall. Apart from weaponry, some of the later levels equip the player with a jet pack, allowing flight over moderate distances.

The Xbox version had the ability to download the "Summer Home" map via Xbox Live

== Plot ==
In the fantasy world of Milola, three outcasts known as the Lionhearts – Roman, Q, and Jonesy – head to the arctic Bergog Wasteland to recruit a small blind man by the name of Rexus who they think they might need to pull off the perfect heist: steal the legendary Book of Rule, a magical book that offers supreme power for anyone who uses it. The reason they need him is because the book had a locking spell which turns it into the Book of Basket Weaving. The Wild Wood Monks have been trying to unlock it for years by the order the villain King Forge, who plans to turn Milola into a theme park for his dim-witted son, Prince Stig, and enslave the rest of the world.

== Development ==
Pre-production on the game started in the Winter of 2001.

== Reception ==
Reception

Aggregate score
Aggregator	Score	
Aggregator	PC	Xbox
Metacritic	78/100	79/100

Review scores
Publication	Score	
Publication	PC	Xbox
Edge	N/A	7/10
Electronic Gaming Monthly	N/A	7.17/10
Game Informer	N/A	8/10
GamePro	N/A	4.5/5
GameRevolution	B−	B−
GameSpot	7.3/10	7.3/10
GameSpy	3/5	4/5
GameZone	8.4/10	8/10
IGN	8.3/10	8.2/10
Official Xbox Magazine (US)	N/A	9/10
PC Gamer (US)	78%	N/A
The Cincinnati Enquirer	(favorable)	(favorable)

The game received "generally favorable reviews" on both platforms according to video game review aggregator Metacritic.

== Backwards compatibility ==
On November 28, 2007, Microsoft released the backward compatibility update for the Xbox 360 which allows Xbox 360 owners to play the Xbox disc version of Armed and Dangerous.

In 2019, Microsoft ended the backward compatibility program for the Xbox One for both Xbox Original and 360 titles. Armed and Dangerous was among the last batch of Xbox Original titles made compatible on the Xbox One system.

Armed and Dangerous was added to the Xbox Marketplace as a digital download for Xbox 360, Xbox One and then-upcoming "Project Scarlet". All disc versions of the game are also playable on all systems.
