= Kannō-ji =

Coordinates: 34°46′23″N 135°19′47″E

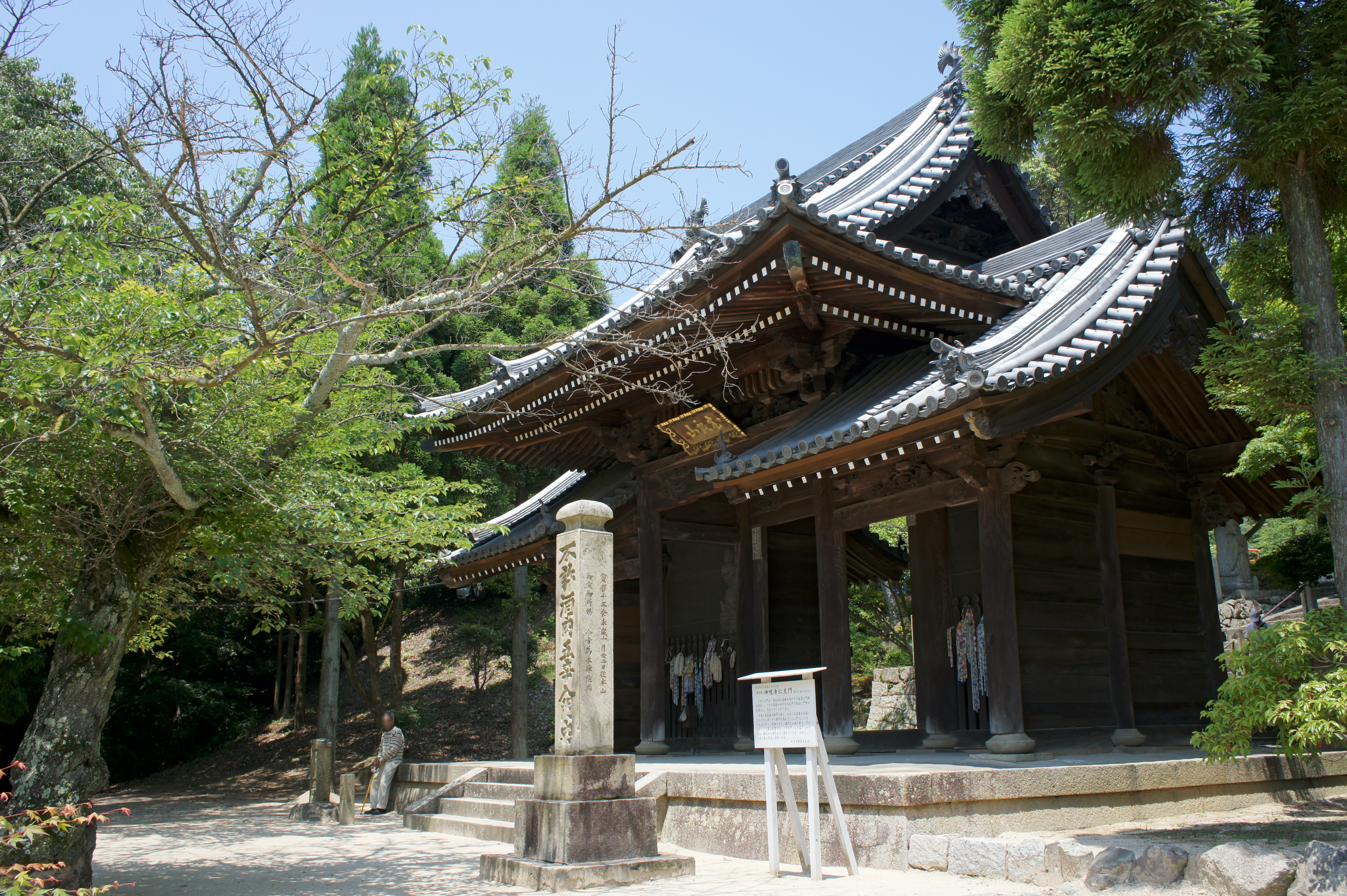
Sanmon

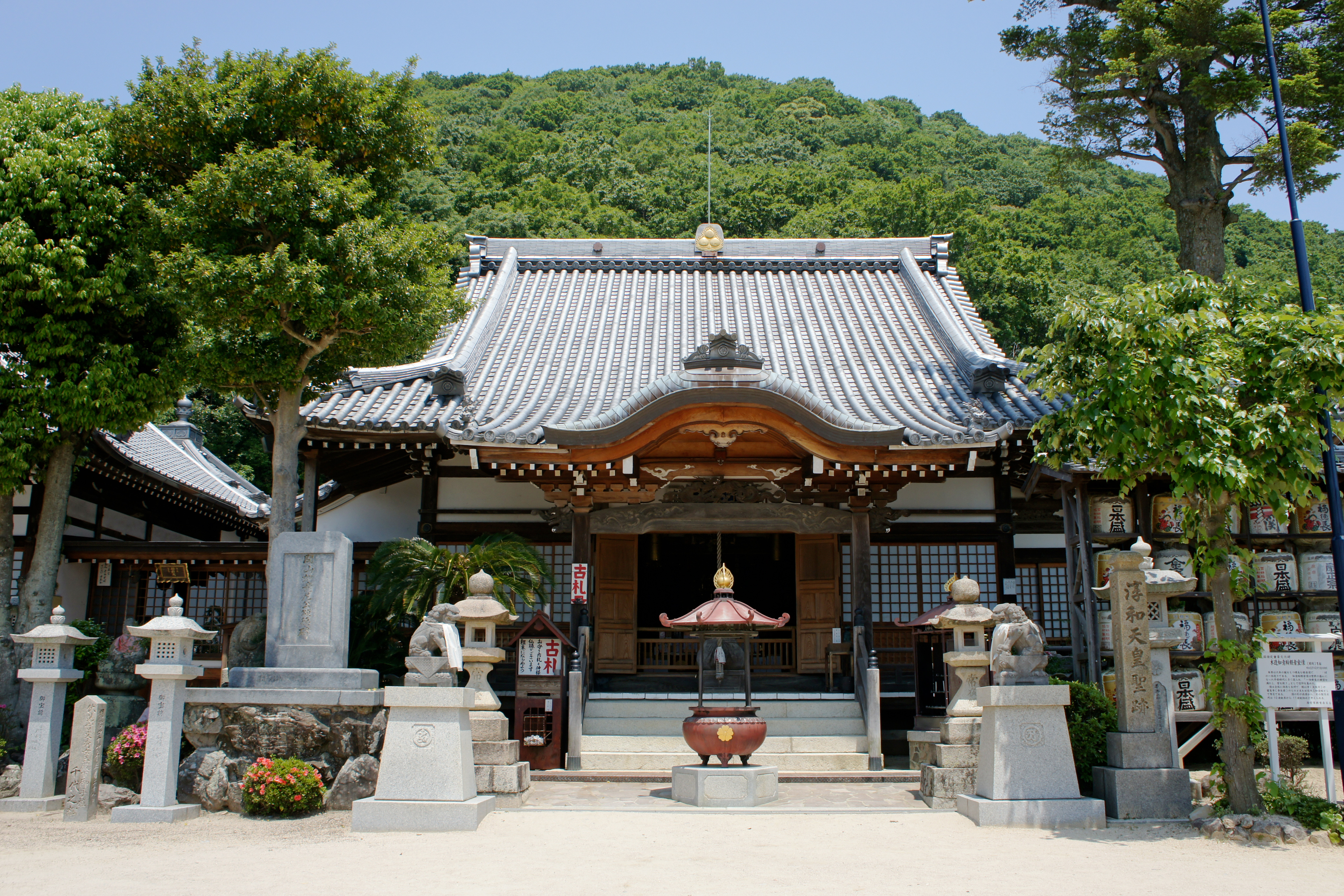
Hondo

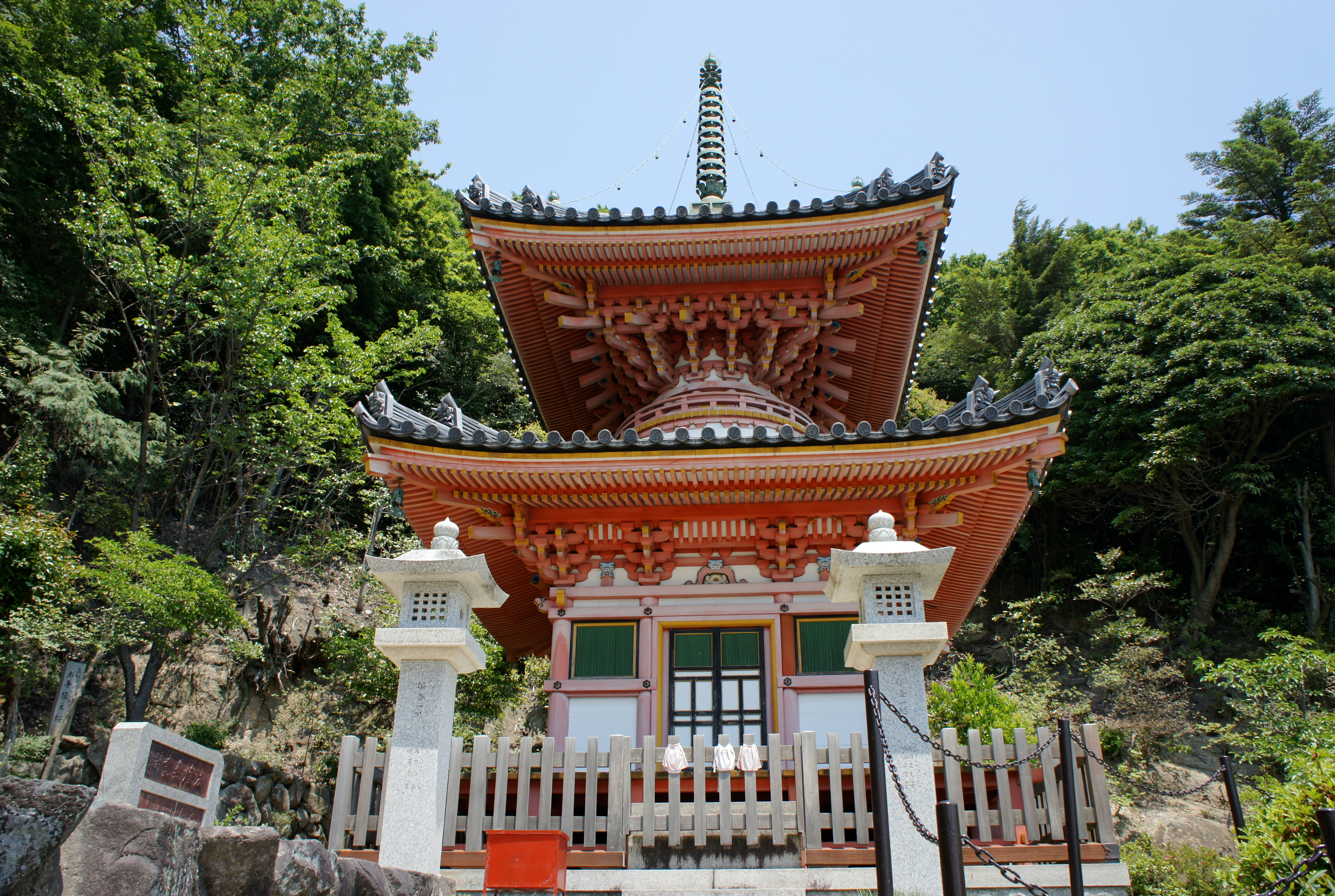
Pagoda

Kannō-ji (Japanese: 神呪寺) is a Buddhist temple in the middle of Mount Kabutoyama in Nishinomiya, Hyōgo, Japan. The other name of the temple is Kabutoyama-daishi (甲山大師).

== Objects of Worship ==
The original object of worship at this temple was Mount Kabutoyama. In this region, Mount Kabutoyama was believed to be "a mountain of god". Until the Edo period, the temple was a mixture of Shinto and Buddhism, as many Japanese temples or shrines. Today, the main object of worship at this temple is a statue of Nyoirin (如意輪半跏像). The statue is known as one of the three most famous Nyoirin statues in Japan, with those of Kawachi-Kannon-ji temple in Osaka Prefecture and Murō-ji temple in Nara Prefecture.

== History ==
According to Genko Shakusho, a famous history of Japanese Buddhism written in the fourteenth century, Kannō-ji was established by the fourth queen of Emperor Junna. However, another history, Teio-Hennnenki, writes that Ujikimi Tachibana (橘氏公) and Shunjo Mihara (三原春上) established the temple at the command of Empress Masako, the first queen of Emperor Junna in 827.

Genko-Shakusho wrote that the fourth queen of Emperor Junna secretly escaped from the Royal Palace in Kyoto and moved to Mount Kabutoyama in 828 with Kūkai's help. Kūkai made a statue of Nyoirin of woods in Mount Kabutoyama in 830, and built the main building of the temple next year.

== Cultural Properties ==
This temple has four national Important Cultural Properties selected by the Japanese government.

- Nyoirin-Kannon-Zazo(木造如意輪観音坐像), Heian period
- Hijiri-Kannon-Ritsuzo(木造聖観音立像), Heian period
- Fudomyoo-Zazo(不動明王坐像), Kamakura period
- Kobodaishi-Zazo(弘法大師坐像), Kamakura period
