= Brain Quest Grades 5 & 6 =

2008 video game

- Developer(s): Planet Moon Studios
- Publisher(s): Electronic Arts
- Platform(s): Nintendo DS
- Release: NA: September 22, 2008
- Genre(s): Educational, puzzle

Brain Quest 5 & 6 is an educational puzzle video game released for the Nintendo DS in North America on September 22, 2008. The game was published by Electronic Arts and was developed by Planet Moon Studios. The game was released at the same time as Brain Quest Grades 3 & 4 and is based on the curriculum-based card deck series of Brain Quest.

== Gameplay ==
The player plays as an unnamed character, who has young children quiz the player trivia questions in multiple categories, such as English, science, mathematics, history, geography and a mixed mode, where all categories are combined into one quiz.

There are multiple formats of question that the player has to answer in. The player is given multiple choice questions, sorting questions and dot connection question. Answering questions correctly gives the player points, with the highest score possible for one round being 5000 points. One round has a total of 5 questions. Getting points allows the player to unlock rewards.
