= Smarty Pants =

2007 video game

- Developer: Planet Moon Studios
- Publisher: Electronic Arts
- Platform: Wii
- Release: NA: November 13, 2007; AU: November 22, 2007; EU: November 23, 2007
- Genre: Quiz
- Modes: Single-player, multiplayer

Smarty Pants: Trivia Fun for Everyone is a quiz video game by Electronic Arts. It was released for the Wii video game console in November 2007. The title features over 20,000 trivia questions covering a variety of topics.

== Gameplay ==
When setting up a game (using existing Miis if desired), players input their ages, allowing the title to tailor the trivia questions to fit the age of the players.

Actual play consists of a variable number of rounds, depending on selected game length. During a round, each player spins a wheel which determines the category for the upcoming set of questions. While spinning and shortly after the wheel stops, players may use the Wii Remote to "bump" the wheel to attempt to land on the desired category. Categories include "Art", "Books", "Entertainment", "Fashion", "Games", "Places & People", "Science" and "Sports".

During typical competitive play, players attempt to answer multiple choice questions before others by quickly "buzzing in". While the question is displayed prior to someone buzzing in, the four available answers are not shown until afterwards, so players may think they know the answer only to be stymied when it is missing as one of the choices. Correct answers reward players with points, while incorrect answers result in a score penalty.

Scoring can be set to be either "Countdown", where points are awarded based on how quickly players answer, or "Wager", where players battle to decide how many points the upcoming set of questions will be worth in advance.

At the end of the game and between certain rounds of longer games, additional bonus rounds are played. During bonus rounds, players take turns answering trivia questions that only one player may answer. Players continue to receive questions until an incorrect answer is given, at which point that player is out of the bonus round. The bonus round continues until all players have given an incorrect answer.

== Reception ==
Reception

Aggregate score
Aggregator	Score
Metacritic	65/100

Review scores
Publication	Score
Game Informer	7.5/10
GamePro	3.75/5
GameRevolution	C
GameSpot	6.5/10
GameSpy	2/5
GameZone	7.4/10
IGN	7/10
NGamer	40%
Official Nintendo Magazine	78%
VideoGamer.com	7/10
411Mania	7.3/10
USA Today	7/10

The game received "mixed or average reviews" according to video game review aggregator Metacritic. Reviewers were pleased with the actual trivia content but questioned the presentation and value. The GameSpot review summarized this sentiment: "It's bare-bones as far as console-based trivia games go, and at $50 it's a good $30 too expensive, but it's still a fun game to break out with groups of friends." The IGN review agreed that the title was probably priced too high, but did note favorably, "Since the interface is easy to navigate and the fundamentals of trivia so inherently intuitive to understand, any casual player can pick this game up and have fun with it [...]"
