= Brain Quest Grades 3 & 4 =

2008 video game

- North American box art
- Developer: Planet Moon Studios
- Publisher: Electronic Arts
- Platform: Nintendo DS
- Release: NA: September 22, 2008
- Genres: Educational, puzzle

Brain Quest 3 & 4 is an educational puzzle video game released for Nintendo DS in North America on September 22, 2008. The game was developed by Planet Moon Studios, and published by Electronic Arts. The game was released at the same time as Brain Quest Grades 5 & 6 and is based on the curriculum-based card deck series Brain Quest.

== Gameplay ==
The player plays as an unnamed character, who has young children quiz him trivia questions in multiple categories, such as English, science, mathematics, history, geography and a mixed mode, where all categories are combined into one quiz.

There are multiple formats of question that the player has to answer in. The player is given multiple choice questions, sorting questions and dot connection question. Answering questions correctly gives the player points, with the highest score possible for one round being 5000 points. One round has a total of 5 questions. Getting points allows the player to unlock rewards.

== Reception ==
Reception

Aggregate score
Aggregator	Score
GameRankings	64%

Review scores
Publication	Score
GameZone	7.0 of 10
IGN	6.7 of 10

Brain Quest Grades 3 & 4 received mixed to positive reviews upon release. The game was praised for its visuals but criticized for its lack of multiplayer options compared to other quiz games on the Nintendo DS.
