= Battle of the Bands (video game) =

2008 video game

- European box art
- Developer: Planet Moon Studios
- Publisher: THQ
- Platform: Wii
- Release: NA: April 21, 2008; EU: May 23, 2008; AU: May 29, 2008
- Genre: Rhythm game
- Modes: Single-player, multiplayer

Battle of the Bands (formerly known as Band Mashups) is a rhythm video game published by THQ and developed by Planet Moon Studios for the Wii console. It was originally released in 2008. The game features 30 licensed songs with 5 cover versions done in completely different styles. The five main genres of music are Rock/Metal, Funk/Hip-Hop, Country Western, Latin, and Marching Band. There are also three tracks performed with an orchestra, making a total of 153 tracks.

== Gameplay ==
The game features two of the eleven bands in the game playing the song head-to-head against one another. Notes will roll up from the bottom of the screen (as opposed to from the top like similar games) and the player must move the remote in sync like a conducting baton. The game also features various power-ups including electrifying the other player's board, shrinking notes, replace notes as landmines, or flipping the notes around and can be activated if played a certain amount of notes in a chain while one of the members attack the enemy band with their instruments formed as guns. However, certain instances allow the other player to block the effects from taking place with synced button presses. The music of the player playing the best will have their music playing dominantly, with the others being less audible. When there is a face off verse, one band attacks while the opposing band defend and vice versa. At the end of the song, the band with the most points will destroy the losing band, then do their winning animation.

== Soundtrack ==
The game features cover versions of thirty licensed songs, each presented in five different musical styles. The songs include:

- Gorillaz - "Feel Good Inc."
- Tag Team - "Whoomp! (There It Is)"
- Tenacious D - "Master Exploder"
- The Ramones - "Blitzkrieg Bop"
- The Commodores - "Brick House"
- KC and the Sunshine Band - "That's the Way (I Like It)"
- Texas Tornados - "Adios Mexico"
- The Black Eyed Peas - "Dum Diddly"
- Cypress Hill - "Insane in the Brain"
- Kool & the Gang - "Jungle Boogie"
- LL Cool J - "Mama Said Knock You Out"
- The Fixx - "One Thing Leads to Another"
- Soundgarden - "Spoonman"
- Def Leppard - "Photograph"
- The Soggy Bottom Boys - "Man of Constant Sorrow"
- B-Real - "Fistful of Dollars"
- Ram Jam - "Black Betty"
- Korn - "Coming Undone"
- Electric Six - "Danger! High Voltage"
- Rick James - "Give It To Me Baby"
- Wet Willie - "Dixie Rock"
- Keane - "Is It Any Wonder?"
- AFI - "Miss Murder"
- TV on the Radio - "Wolf Like Me"
- Texas Tornados - "Una Mas Cerveza"
- The Georgia Satellites - "Keep Your Hands To Yourself"
- Audioslave - "Original Fire"
- Texas Tornados - "Hey Baby Que Paso"
- Latin Soul Syndicate - "Shake It"
- Ziroq - "Tierra del Sur"

== Reception ==
Reception

Aggregate score
| Aggregator | Score |
|---|---|
| Metacritic | 58/100 |

Review scores
| Publication | Score |
|---|---|
| Destructoid | 5/10 |
| Eurogamer | 5/10 |
| Game Informer | 6/10 |
| GamePro | 4/5 |
| GameRevolution | D+ |
| GameSpot | 6/10 |
| GameSpy | 2.5/5 |
| GameTrailers | 4.2/10 |
| GameZone | 5.5/10 |
| IGN | 5.6/10 |
| Nintendo Power | 7/10 |

Battle of the Bands received "mixed" reviews according to video game review aggregator Metacritic.
