= MDK =

1997 video game

- North American PC cover art
- Developer: Shiny Entertainment (Note: Ported to Mac OS by Shokwave and ported to PlayStation by Neversoft)
- Publishers: NA: PIE; EU: Shiny Entertainment
- Producers: David Perry; Scott Herrington
- Designers: Nick Bruty; Tim Williams; Bob Stevenson
- Programmers: Andy Astor; Martin Brownlow
- Artists: Nick Bruty; Bob Stevenson
- Writer: Nick Bruty
- Composers: Todd Dennis; Tommy Tallarico (producer)
- Platforms: Windows, MS-DOS, Mac OS, PlayStation
- Release: Windows & MS-DOS: UK: March 27, 1997; NA: May 5, 1997; Mac OS: WW: 1997; PlayStation: NA: November 13, 1997; EU: November 14, 1997; JP: August 5, 1999
- Genre: Third-person shooter
- Mode: Single-player

MDK is a 1997 third-person shooter video game developed by Shiny Entertainment for Windows and subsequently ported to Mac OS by Shokwave, and to the PlayStation by Neversoft. The game was published on all systems by Playmates Interactive Entertainment (PIE) in North America, while Shiny handled the European release.

The game tells the story of Kurt Hectic, a janitor who reluctantly attempts to save Earth from an alien invasion of gigantic strip mining city-sized vehicles named "Minecrawlers". The Minecrawlers are ruthlessly harvesting Earth's natural resources and crushing any people and cities that get in their way. Assisted by his somewhat eccentric boss, Dr. Fluke Hawkins, an inventive scientist, and an unusual robotic companion named Bones, Kurt embarks on a quest to infiltrate each Minecrawler and eliminate its pilot. After accomplishing this dangerous task, he must return to Dr. Hawkins' in-orbit space station, the Jim Dandy.

Conceived and co-designed by Nick Bruty, MDK was Shiny's first PC game, and was notable for using software rendering, requiring a Pentium or equivalent microprocessor, rather than necessitating any GPU enhancements, despite its large 3D levels and complex polygonal enemies. As the developers were attempting very ambitious things, they wrote their own programming language. Additionally, when in sniper mode, the player has the ability to zoom up to 100x, but the developers chose not to employ any of the standard solutions to pop-up, such as clipping or fogging. They also worked to ensure the game ran at a minimum of 30 fps at all times on all machines. The game's original system requirements were a 60 MHz Pentium, 16MB of RAM, 17MB of hard drive storage, an SVGA-compatible video card, and a Sound Blaster or equivalent sound card.

MDK received generally positive reviews, with critics praising the gameplay, the level design, the sardonic sense of humor, the game's technical accomplishments, and the use of sniper mode. The most often repeated criticisms included that the game was too short, and the story was weak. The game was a commercial success, and Interplay approached Bruty to work on a sequel immediately. However, he was already developing Giants: Citizen Kabuto, so BioWare was hired to develop the game. MDK2 was published for Windows and the Dreamcast in 2000, and for the PlayStation 2 (as MDK 2: Armageddon) in 2001. In 2007, Interplay announced a third game was planned, but it was never made.

== Gameplay ==
For the most part, MDK is a run-and-gun third-person shooter. It also features several minigames, and allows the player to enter first-person mode at any time they wish to use their sniper weapon. The basic design of the game involves distinct levels in which the player character, Kurt Hectic, must infiltrate a "Minecrawler", fight his way through an array of enemies, tackle some rudimentary puzzles, and reach the control center, where he must then eliminate the pilot in a boss fight. Every level is completely different; enemies, level design, aesthetic, and control center layout, with a different strategy required to eliminate each pilot.

During the run-and-gun gameplay, the player must frequently use Kurt's "ribbon chute", a parachute contained within his outfit that can be used indefinitely. The chute allows Kurt to make long jumps, survive long falls, and utilize updrafts. It deploys immediately and retracts automatically when not being used. Kurt also has access to a smart bomb feature, where he can call Max to fly a bomber over the battle area and drop bombs on the enemies. To call Max, Kurt must have collected an airstrike pickup within the game. He must enter sniper mode to select the area he wants Max to target. Additionally, the airstrike can only be used in exterior locations on the Minecrawler. Other weaponry in the game includes grenades, "The World's Most Interesting Bomb" (when Kurt throws the bomb, all enemies within the vicinity will approach it, at which point Kurt can detonate it), "The Very Large Hamster Hammer" (a giant hammer that causes the ground to vibrate violently, damaging any nearby enemies), and "The World's Smallest Nuclear Explosion" (used for opening locked doors).

In addition to the run-and-gun/sniper modes, there are several additional gameplay modes in MDK. All levels start out with an "atmospheric entry" in which Kurt jumps from his base ship, the Jim Dandy space station, which is in orbit around Earth, to the Minecrawler on the planet's surface. As he descends, the Minecrawler activates its radar, which, if touched, triggers the launch of anti-air missiles, which must be dodged. Some levels feature Kurt taking over an enemy bombing ship and performing bombing runs, some feature a glider which Kurt must ride to a specific location. One level features several snowboarding sequences, where Kurt must navigate obstacles while destroying enemies. Additionally, once a level has been completed, the Minecrawler disintegrates, and is sucked back into the energy stream from which it emerged, taking Kurt with it. Kurt then has a set period of time in the energy stream, during which he pursues a health power-up, which, if collected, grants 150% health for the start of the next level. If he touches the walls of the stream, he loses health and decelerates. At the end of the set period, Max will enter the stream on a tether and pull Kurt back to the Jim Dandy.

Sniper mode in MDK. Bullet selection is on the left; health is indicated in the circle on the right. Above the health meter is the current zoom of the sniper weapon. The three "bullet cams" are at the top of the screen.

Kurt's main defense against his enemies is his "Coil Suit", a skin-tight armor made of a Kevlar-like material, and created on a "nuclear-blast proof sewing machine". This suit serves as a bulletproof vest during the combat sections of the game, and also protects Kurt from friction and heat during the atmospheric entry sections. Kurt's weapon is a chain gun, which is attached to his arm, and carries unlimited ammo. The other major weapon in the game is a sniper gun. This is created when Kurt detaches his chain gun from his arm and mounts it onto his helmet. The sniper weapon can zoom up to 100x, and has the capability of supporting five different types of ammunition, including homing missiles and mortar shells. Kurt does not actually see out of the helmet, rather, he sees out of a HUD, which he uses to aim. There are also three "Bullet Cams" that track each projectile and linger briefly after impact, showing any damage done. However, when Kurt is in sniper mode, he is unable to move, and can thus be easily targeted by enemies.

The enemies in MDK are a collective of aliens called "Streamriders" under the command of Gunter Glut. Each Minecrawler is manned primarily by various types of soldiers named "Grunts." Some areas contain "Grunt generators" which create an infinite number of enemies until destroyed. Apart from Grunts, and each Minecrawler's unique pilot, Kurt also encounters various types of robots, tanks, automated and manned turrets, animals, small attack ships, troop transport ships, and sentry drones.

== Plot ==
The story of the game begins in 1996 when inventor/scientist Dr. Fluke Hawkins believes he has made a revolutionary discovery; an outer space phenomenon he calls "Flange Orbits". However, when he approaches the scientific community with his discovery, he is ridiculed. Determined to prove his colleagues wrong, Hawkins builds a space station, the Jim Dandy, and bribes aboard his laboratory janitor, Kurt Hectic, by means of Hungarian goulash. He then launches the station into orbit, projecting that the mission will last five days. However, after a week, Hawkins realizes Flange Orbits do not actually exist, but rather than return to Earth in shame, he decides to remain on the Dandy to try to discover something, anticipating another week in space. Kurt is extremely unhappy with this development, but once Hawkins shows him how to program the VCR, he calms down.

A year later, having made no discoveries, Hawkins begins work building a genetically engineered robotic dog, which he plans to call "Bones". After a year, Bones is fully operational, although both Bones and Kurt prefer the name Max. Despite having four arms and two legs, and being full of energy, Max proves more than a little reluctant to help Hawkins with the chores on the Dandy, proving more interested in tending to his vegetable garden.

Another year passes without Hawkins making a breakthrough until he notices streams of energy moving through the Solar System towards Earth. He sends a warning down to Earth (along with some of Max's oranges), but it is ignored. Upon reaching Earth, the streams disgorge gigantic "Minecrawlers", city-sized vehicles designed to strip mine the natural resources from a planet, crushing anything and everything in their path. The aliens, known as "Streamriders", and under the command of Gunter Glut, easily demolish all of Earth's military forces, and so Hawkins decides to take action to save the planet. Hawkins reasons the only way to fight the aliens is with his newly invented "Coil Suit", but due to his advancing years and Max's extra pair of legs, Kurt is the only one who can wear it, and, thus, becomes the very reluctant hero.

As such, Kurt is dispatched on "Mission: Deliver Kindness". This involves Kurt entering the Minecrawlers from above, and destroying them from the inside-out, shooting his way through to the pilot, whom he then kills, before being extracted back to the Jim Dandy. Kurt fights his way through a number of Minecrawlers, destroying them one by one, until he reaches the Crawler piloted by Gunter Glut himself. Kurt destroys the final Minecrawler, but Glut captures Max, and escapes into an energy stream leading to his base ship. Kurt gives chase and frees Max, who tricks Glut into eating him. Max then kills Glut by exploding him from within. The two then escape and destroy Glut's ship. The ending sequence is a monochrome mix of a French music video ("Non Non Rien N'a Changé" by Billy Ze Kick) and clips from the MDK promotional video.

== Development ==
=== Origins ===
MDK's writer, co-designer and co-artist Nick Bruty has said the initial impetus for the game was his desire to move away from the type of game on which he had previously been working; family-friendly games such as Aladdin (1993), The Jungle Book (1993), Earthworm Jim (1994) and Earthworm Jim 2 (1995), all of which Bruty had worked on for the Sega Genesis. According to Bruty,

MDK was a reaction, or outburst, from having worked back-to-back on cartoon games such as Aladdin, Jungle Book and Earthworm Jim. Don't get me wrong, I loved working on those games and learning new styles; but my heart is in fantasy and science fiction. I knew straight away that this was what I wanted to do next.

Bruty's first image for the game was a doodle of an armor suit with a self-contained machine gun, and a helmet that could be used as a sniper rifle. Once he had this concept in place, he wrote a rough draft of the story, and brought together a small team of people with whom he had worked before; programmer Andy Astor, designer Tim Williams, artist and designer Bob Stevenson, animator Shawn Nelson and, later, programmer Martin Brownlow. One of the first decisions the team made was not to develop the game for the system with which they had the most experience, the Sega Genesis, but instead to develop it for the PC, making it Shiny's first PC game.

Developing for the PC brought a number of advantages, not the least of which was it allowed the team to make the game using 3D computer graphics. As Bruty explains, "I wanted to work on PC because the game was 3D, which wasn't an option on consoles at that point." Tim Williams explains another advantage of working on PC was "it meant I wouldn't have to tone the game down to deal with the Sega and Nintendo's ratings boards. I loved [the concept]. I could see the game immediately would have a unique look and plenty of design opportunities. We were all big fans of the Alien movies and H. R. Giger, so that probably had some influence." As Shiny intended the game to be gory, even going so far as to study tapes of people dying in gruesome manners to see the effects of violent deaths on the human body, this lack of censorship was ideal. Once the decision was made to develop for the PC, the team quickly decided they wanted to make a game that would push the boundaries of PC games beyond anything seen up to that point.

The naming of Kurt Hectic was inspired by two disparate sources. In the early stages of development, some of the team saw the 1993 Mike Leigh film, Naked, in which David Thewlis' character says to a junkie, "What is it like in your head? Hectic?" Bruty and Williams loved the line, and decided Hectic should be the character's surname. When trying to think of his first name, they wanted to name him after someone who lived a notoriously hectic life, and settled on Kurt Cobain.

=== Gameplay development ===
At the time, the shooter game market was dominated by first-person shooters, most of which worked off the template set by Doom and Quake. However, the developers were never interested in making a first-person shooter. Bruty was particularly passionate about this aspect of the game, arguing "I feel the player is more involved in the world when they can see their own character." Williams agrees; "We wanted the player to see all the cool actions the main character would be performing, so third-person was the natural choice and challenge we went for."

From the earliest stages of level design, it was decided each level would begin with a free-fall minigame, before the level proper begins. Initially, the plan was for Kurt to travel through each level on a futuristic motorcycle, which would morph around him to protect him and would be integrated into his Coil Suit. However, this idea was ultimately scrapped in favor of a more straightforward 3D "run-and-gun" style gameplay. Another early concept that was scrapped was that sniper mode would only be available to the player during the boss fight at the end of each level. This was changed so the player could use sniper mode whenever they wished. An early concept which did make it into the final game was the notion of ridiculous weaponry. One of the first such weapons conceived was the "World's Smallest Nuclear Bomb," as the team wanted to come up with the most over-the-top way imaginable to open a door.

=== Visual design ===
Each level in the game was crafted by a different designer, resulting in a diverse and distinct visual experience throughout. To achieve lifelike movements for Kurt and the enemies, the developers utilized motion capture, a groundbreaking technology in video game development at that time. Unlike previous motion capture implementations, they broke down the motion scripts for individual limbs, enabling them to mix and match animations, leading to a broader range of movements.

Creating Kurt's character involved a critical consideration: ensuring a seamless transition between third-person and sniper modes. To tackle this challenge, the developers ingeniously designed Kurt's sniper rifle to be the same as his machine gun, allowing him to attach the gun to his helmet effortlessly. This decision aligned well with the game's theme, making Kurt's Coil Suit a self-contained and versatile offensive/defensive ensemble. When designing the suit, Bruty drew inspiration from elegant and ornate Spanish armor, seeking to bring more flair to the character's appearance.

During atmospheric entry sequences, a 3D model of Kurt was employed, while pre-rendered sprites were predominantly used during gameplay for optimal performance. Zeschuk found inspiration for Max's character in figures like Chow Yun-fat, Snoopy and Gromit. He described the Doctor as an archetypal kooky inventor and Kurt as the straight man - the ordinary person navigating a bizarre world.

The process of designing enemies involved sketching each type on paper before constructing a 3D wire-frame model, which was then integrated into the gaming environment. Subsequently, these models were transformed into texture-mapped polygons and animated using data gathered from the motion capture system. The attention to detail extended to larger enemies, whose polygon structures allowed players to target specific body parts, such as legs, arms, and even the eyes of certain adversaries.

=== Technology ===
MDK attempted things never before seen in a PC game, so the team decided to write their own programming language. Rather than having the programmers write the language, the designers and artists also worked on it, allowing a more collaboratively creative atmosphere than is usual, and facilitating the language to work specifically to accommodate the elements of the game which the designers and artists wished to achieve.

Sniper mode was a major part of the game, with the ability to zoom up to 100x. The team decided not to employ any of the usual techniques to limit pop-up, such as clipping and fogging. A major technical issue was the frame rate. Shiny felt most PC games maintained frame rate by using big pixels in low resolution, which works as long as the game is not running SVGA mode. Based on their experiences developing for consoles, they wanted to take a different approach; using small pixels in high resolution. They set a target of maintaining a constant frame rate of at least 30fps at all times on all machines, and play-tested the game multiple times. When the frame rate dropped below 30, they either removed something from that part of the game, rewrote the graphics code, or altered the artwork until they could get the frame rate back up to where they wanted without having to reduce resolution or increase pixel size. According to Bruty, "We had no idea how fast we could get the engine when we started. The game would run too slow if we textured everything, so some parts were just flat-shaded for speed. We did our best to make that look like a design choice, or shadows, but it was a tricky balance."

When the game debuted at the 1996 E3 event in April, producer David Perry emphasized that he felt Shiny's lack of experience on the PC was to their advantage; "instead of simply rewriting a game that's already been written and having to meet a set of expectations, we can shoot really high."

MDK was designed at a time when 3D games were becoming popular, but GPUs hadn't had much impact on game development, and as such, "graphics would be designed to operate in software." Ultimately, the initial release of the game relied wholly on software rendering, without any additional GPU requirements. The game's original system requirements were a 60 MHz Pentium (although 90 MHz was recommended), 16MB of RAM, 17MB of hard drive storage for basic installation (37MB for full installation), an SVGA compatible video card, and a Sound Blaster or equivalent sound card; basic specs for the time. However, patches were later released that added support for popular 3D APIs.

=== Mac OS port ===
Playmates Interactive finalized the publishing deal for a Macintosh version of MDK in August 1997, but the conversion to the Macintosh OS had already been in development for some time before that. This version was bundled with the original iMac.

=== PlayStation port ===
In December 1996, it was revealed the game was being ported to the PlayStation by Neversoft. The Neversoft team had an initial deadline of six months. According to developer Mick West, the sheer size of the PC version presented problems for the port, but in some respects, the PlayStation version would improve on the PC version;

The PC version keeps a lot of data resident whilst you go between areas. We're going to spool a lot more between the areas. And we're also compressing the data, which leads to a little bit of degradation on things like animations but it's hardly noticeable at all. It looks almost identical, in terms of the amount of animations and the amount of graphics in the game. But we have a lot more colors on screen. On the PC, they're limited to using one 256-color palette. We're not limited at all, we can use as many palettes as we like. Each texture in the game has its own palette, which means effectively we've got 32,000 colors on screen at once, which gives a lot more vibrancy to the look of the game. We're also using proper transparency. We're going to be doing some lighting effects that they don't have the power to do on the PC.

Because the PC version was still months away from completion when work on the PlayStation port began, the Neversoft team had to continually adjust their work in response to updates they received from Shiny.

=== Meaning of "MDK" ===
While the precise meaning of the title's three-letter acronym is never revealed during the game, the videogame press and fans adopted "Murder, Death, Kill", which was coined in the 1993 film Demolition Man. Another possibility is documented in the game manual, where Kurt's mission is named "Mission: Deliver Kindness". It could also stand for the first initials of the game's characters; Max, Dr. Hawkins, and Kurt. In the README for the PC version of the game, it is stated "It stands for whatever we say it stands for on any given day; i.e., today it stands for Mother's Day Kisses..." In the European PC release, the background images during installation present many possible meanings for the letters; one of which is "Murder, Death, Kill". In the Japanese release, on the back cover it says in bold yellow letters: "My Dear Knight". During the installation of MDK2, various meanings are shown, again including "Murder, Death, Kill". The original meaning of "MDK" from the company's initial promo video was in fact "Murder Death Kill". In a 2009 interview with NowGamer, David Perry revealed that because the North American publisher PIE was supposed to make toys based on the game, they did not like the title, so the words were removed and simply replaced with "MDK".

In 2011 on the official GOG.com forum for the game, Nick Bruty (creator of MDK) posted that the letters do indeed stand for "Murder Death Kill".

=== Digital re-release ===
MDK became available digitally for newer Windows releases on GOG.com in September 2008 among the service's first games. A macOS version was added on October 26, 2012.

== Reception ==
Reception

Aggregate score
Aggregator	Score	
Aggregator	PC	PS
GameRankings	89%	76%

Review scores
Publication	Score	
Publication	PC	PS
Electronic Gaming Monthly	N/A	6.875/10
GamePro	5/5	5/5
GameRevolution	A−	N/A
GameSpot	7.6/10	7/10
Hyper	89%	N/A
IGN	N/A	8/10
Next Generation	4/5	N/A
PC PowerPlay	83%	N/A

It received generally positive reviews on both PC and PlayStation. The Windows version holds an aggregate score of 89% on GameRankings, based on five reviews. The PlayStation version holds a score of 76%, based on six reviews.

Next Generation reviewed the PC version of the game, stating that "MDK is a game that no self-respective gamer will want to miss." GamePro gave it a perfect 5.0 out of 5 in all four categories (graphics, sound, control, and funfactor), saying it "easily lives up to all its rampant hype, delivering one of the year's most creative, engrossing, and just plain fun games." The reviewer particularly applauded the "floating third-person view", Kurt's arsenal of abilities, the effective realization of the setting, and the varied gameplay experiences. Game Revolution's Johnny Lee called the game "Non-stop 3D shooting, killing, exploding, dodging, parachuting, running, ambushing, assassinating, jumping, mind blowing action!" He commented that it stands out from other games with its requisite parachuting skills, sniping mode, bombing minigame, and acerbic sense of humor. He concluded "MDK combines sweet graphics and 'revolutionary' gameplay and design concepts to put it in a class by itself." GameSpot's Jeff Sengstack called it "a visually exciting, mentally challenging shooter with a humorous and twisted viewpoint." He praised the wide-open environments, variety of visual styles, gameplay innovations, sniper mode, humor, ingeniousness of the puzzle designs, and the originality of some of the weaponry and enemies, though he was critical of the controls and the short length of the game.

Electronic Gaming Monthly (EGM) and IGN both strongly approved of the quality of the PlayStation port, particularly citing the retention of all the content of the PC version and the addition of the new warp rooms. IGN's Jay Boor said it "has to be one of the most impressive PC to PlayStation ports I have ever seen." However, GamePro noted that the graphics, though outstanding by PlayStation standards, were downgraded from the PC version, and judged that the new content was not enough to merit a replay from those who had already played the PC version. They nonetheless gave the PlayStation version a perfect 5.0 out of 5 in all four categories (fun factor, graphics, sound, and control), remarking, "MDK is riveting, combining tensely paced run-n-gun gameplay with the stealthy, strategic stalking that the sniper helmet enables." EGM and GameSpot were not as convinced, citing polygon breakup, control issues, excessively low difficulty, and the brevity of the game. Crispin Boyer of EGM summarized, "This heavily hyped shooter/platform hybrid is intense, fun, funny, over the top - and over way too soon." GameSpot's Josh Smith wrote "MDK is something of a mixed bag. Amazing graphics style, but little graphical consistency. Awesome combat action, but little combat challenge. Great puzzles, but they're really pretty simple, and the whole game can be solved without using too many brain cells." Reviews widely praised the sniper mode, graphics, and overall unique gameplay and style.

=== Sales and sequel ===
The game was both a critical and a commercial success, and Interplay decided to begin work on a sequel immediately. According to the publisher, global sales of MDK surpassed 400,000 copies by June 1998. Its sales had reached 500,000 copies by early 2000. Interplay approached Bruty for ideas, but he did not want to go straight into another MDK game; "I hadn't liked rushing from Earthworm Jim to its sequel without a creative break, and I felt the game suffered because of that." In any case, his new development studio, Planet Moon Studios, was already working on Giants: Citizen Kabuto. Bruty asked Interplay if they would consider waiting until he was finished on Giants before beginning on MDK2, but they chose to press on with the game without him, handing development over to BioWare.

== TV series ==
An MDK animated TV series, set to be produced by Mainframe Entertainment, was announced for a 1998 release but was ultimately never aired.
