= Drawn to Life: The Next Chapter (Wii video game) =

2009 Wii video game

- Worldwide box art
- Developer: Planet Moon Studios
- Publisher: THQ
- Director: Raven Alef
- Designers: Casey Holtz; Jason Weesner
- Programmer: Chris Cammack
- Artists: Ken Capelli; Trevor Grimshaw; Steve Royer
- Writer: Scott Rogers
- Composers: Dave Levison; Chris Remo; Bill Storkson; Rich Vreeland
- Series: Drawn to Life
- Platform: Wii
- Release: AU: October 8, 2009; EU: October 16, 2009; NA: October 27, 2009
- Genres: Action-adventure, platform
- Modes: Single-player, multiplayer

Drawn to Life: The Next Chapter is a platform game developed by Planet Moon Studios and published by THQ for the Wii. Despite having the same title, it has a different plot compared to the DS version.

== Plot ==
The Raposa Village has been in peace for a long time, until items from the city start disappearing. The mayor, Mari, asks the Creator to draw a new hero for help. Jowee believes that Zsasha (a well-known thief) has stolen the items and gone off to Jangala. The hero and Jowee (who loves adventure) go off to Jangala to find Zsasha, who has been held captive for days by the monkey king. Shadow walkers appear, invading Jangala. After the Hero defeats them and saves Zsasha, the monkey king releases him and gives them a strange mask. Mari realizes Zsasha did not steal the items, leading her to suspect that Wilfre might be the thief. To make sure if Wilfre is alive, Mari sends the Hero (and Jowee) to Shadow City. Soon, the Hero finds the ink factory working again, creating shadows.

The Hero then finds Wilfre's journal, which holds a plot to destroy the Creator as a backup plan, along with a pen and pencil. His plan requires the Artifacts of Power: branches from the Tree of Ages, the eternal furnace, a pen and pencil, and a magic mask, all which will allow him to gain power that rivals the Creator. Mari and the other Raposa realize that Wilfre specifically wants to make creation ink to remake the world in his own image. They already have the latter two items, meaning that they just need to find the eternal furnace and branches from the tree of ages in order to stop Wilfre.

Mari sends the Hero to Icy Wastes to find the eternal furnace. While there, a strange shadow creature appears, stealing it. The shadow creature is unknown, but resembles a Raposa girl. After the Hero and Jowee return, they discover that in the Eastern Winds, the Tree of Ages is in danger. They defeat the shadow creatures attacking it, and the Hero saves the tree.

Mari is happy Wilfre's plan has failed, until Circi reveals that she's Wilfre's wife, and was the mastermind behind the plan after all. She uses the items that the Hero had found to make creation ink and revive Wilfre, but she cannot remember what he looks like. She keeps on drawing pictures of him, but they don't resemble him. Frustrated, she throws away the pictures, but they - along with the items used to create the ink - begin to combine, creating a monster that kills her. It then floods the village with ink. The Hero fights the dark monster in a final showdown, defeating it. The Creator discards the Artifacts of Power into the sea to keep them from being misused. The game ends with all of the Raposa celebrating, although their joy is bittersweet.

== Development ==
In February 2008, THQ announced that a Wii version of Drawn to Life was planned, which several news outlets reported would be a port of the original DS title rather than a new entry in the series.

Drawn to Life: The Next Chapter was announced on May 26, 2009, as a dual release for the Nintendo DS and Wii. The Wii version was developed by Planet Moon Studios instead of the original series creator, 5th Cell, who were busy developing the DS version as well as Scribblenauts. Planet Moon Studios was chosen for the game, as they had worked with THQ before and were already developing a separate drawing-based game at the time.

Although it was initially described as a prequel to the DS version, the game has since been confirmed to be non-canonical.

== Reception ==
Reception

Aggregate score
Aggregator	Score
Metacritic	58/100

Review scores
Publication	Score
Edge	5/10
Eurogamer	5/10
Game Informer	5.75/10
GameSpot	6.5/10
IGN	6.2/10
Nintendo Power	7/10
VideoGamer.com	7/10

The game received "mixed or average reviews" according to video game review aggregator platform Metacritic.
