= Kabuto Rock =

Kabuto Rock (68°3′S 43°36′E) is a large, blunt rock projecting from the coast about midway between Chijire Glacier and Rakuda Glacier in Queen Maud Land, Antarctica. It was mapped from surveys and air photos by the Japanese Antarctic Research Expedition, 1957–62, who also gave the name. Shinobi Rock is nearby.
