= Infected (video game) =

2005 video game

- North American box art
- Developer: Planet Moon Studios
- Publisher: Majesco
- Director: Tim Williams
- Producers: Aaron Loeb; Dean Martinetti
- Designer: Jeffrey Sondin-Kung
- Programmer: Ike Herman
- Artist: Ken Capelli
- Writer: Tim Williams
- Engine: RenderWare
- Platform: PlayStation Portable
- Release: NA: November 15, 2005; PAL: September 29, 2006
- Genre: Third-person shooter
- Modes: Single-player, multiplayer

Infected is a 2005 third-person shooter for the PlayStation Portable, developed by Planet Moon Studios.

== Plot ==
Infected puts players in the role of a police officer in New York City, 3 weeks before Christmas while the entire city is rapidly being infected with a virus that turns people into ravaging, bloodthirsty zombies. The player's blood contains the cure, which less than 1% of the population possesses. The objective is to destroy the infected while trying to reach someone who can make a cure from the blood.

== Gameplay ==
Gameplay is a frantic over-the-shoulders blaster which revolves around the player's two weapons; a primary weapon and a Viral gun. Players must damage an enemy until their energy level drops to zero. This allows the player to use the Viral gun on them, killing the enemy. Missions include clearing areas and rescuing civilians. There is a gauge called the "Infected" bar. This has 3 sections to it; one for zombie level, one for area threat and one for the civilian level. If the civilian level drops down very low then the Zombie threat will increase and cause a rush of enemies to the player's vicinity. The enemies in this rush will be a lot more difficult to dispatch. In the game the player can use different avatars which also include band members from Slipknot, as well as Rayne from BloodRayne, and Mark Hunter from Chimaira.

Whenever a player starts a mission, they begin with the lowest weapon available. As more kills are performed, a gauge on the right of the player's display fills up and when the gauge passes certain levels, the next weapon is offered to the player. Players have to maintain their kill rate however, as this gauge does slowly trickle back down if no kills are maintained (i.e. the player will only be able to use lower based weapons again). Weapons are upgradable up to a maximum of level 3. At the same time sub-weapons can become available for purchase, which once bought appear as random drops during missions rather than being equipped from the start.

== Reception ==
Reception

Aggregate score
Aggregator	Score
Metacritic	74/100

Review scores
Publication	Score
1Up.com	A−
Edge	5/10
Game Informer	8.25/10
GamePro	3.5/5
GameSpot	7.2/10
GameSpy	3.5/5
GameZone	8.2/10
IGN	7.6/10
Official U.S. PlayStation Magazine	4/5
X-Play	3/5
Detroit Free Press	4/4
The Sydney Morning Herald	2.5/5

The game received "average" reviews according to video game review aggregator Metacritic. In his December 11, 2004 review, Jim Schaefer of Detroit Free Press initially gave the game three stars out of four, stating that "In these days of bird flu and fears of a real-world pandemic, a game called "Infected" leaves me a wee bit leery. The big deal about this game is that you can make your mark in it across the world - and I'm not talking about the usual route of racking up points to sit atop some leader board." A week later, however, he raised the grade to all four stars, stating that, "The online ability to spread an infection to another player is so innovative that this game gets my top award, even if it's not perfect in other areas."
