= Giants: Citizen Kabuto =

2000 video game

- Windows version cover art
- Developer: Planet Moon Studios
- Publishers: Interplay Entertainment; MacPlay (Mac OS X)
- Director: Tim Williams
- Producers: Jim Molitor; Shawn Jacoby
- Designers: Nick Bruty; Bob Stevenson; Tim Williams
- Programmers: Andy Astor; Dave Aufderheide; Scott Guest
- Artists: Nick Bruty; Ken Capelli; Bob Stevenson
- Writer: Tim Williams
- Composers: Jeremy Soule; Julian Soule; Mark Morgan
- Platforms: Microsoft Windows, Mac OS X, PlayStation 2
- Release: Windows: NA: December 7, 2000; EU: December 22, 2000; Mac OS X: NA: October 25, 2001; PlayStation 2: NA: December 21, 2001; EU: March 15, 2002
- Genres: Third-person shooter, real-time strategy
- Modes: Single-player, multiplayer (Windows and Mac OS X only)

Giants: Citizen Kabuto is a third-person shooter video game with real-time strategy elements. It was the first project for Planet Moon Studios, which consisted of former Shiny Entertainment employees who had worked on the game MDK in 1997. Giants went through four years of development before Interplay Entertainment published it on December 7, 2000, for Microsoft Windows; a Mac OS X port was published by MacPlay in 2001, and the game was also ported to the PlayStation 2 later that year.

In the game, players take control of a single character from one of three humanoid races to either complete the story in single-player mode or to challenge other players in online multiplayer matches. They can select heavily armed Meccaryns equipped with jet packs, or amphibious spell-casting Sea Reapers; the game's subtitle, "Citizen Kabuto", refers to the last selectable race, a thundering behemoth who can execute earthshaking wrestling attacks to pulverize its enemies. The single-player mode is framed as a sequential story, putting the player through a series of missions, several of which test the player's reflexes in action-game-like puzzles.

Game critics praised Giants for its state-of-the-art graphics on Windows computers, a humorous story, and successfully blending different genres. Criticisms focused on crippling software bugs and the lack of an in-game save feature. The console version rectified some of the flaws found in the PC versions, at the cost of removing several features. The game initially sold poorly for Windows and PlayStation 2, but it sold well afterwards, and gained a cult following.

== Gameplay ==
In Giants: Citizen Kabuto, players take on the roles of three humanoid races: gun-toting Meccaryns, magic-wielding Sea Reapers, and the gigantic Kabuto. Each player is assigned direct control of a single character. The game's developers, Planet Moon Studios, created this design to encourage players to focus on the action and not to be burdened with micromanagement. Players can customize the controls, which are largely the same for each race, with slight differences for abilities.

The single-player mode consists of a sequence of missions set as an overarching story. Each mission requires the completion of certain objectives to progress to the next mission. The objectives are usually the elimination of enemies or a certain structure, but several of them test the player's eye–hand coordination or require the player to rescue and protect certain units. Players control their characters from a default third person perspective; a first person view is optional. Each race has its own offensive style, and a special mode of fast movement. Killing a creature releases a power-up, which heals or awards weapons to its collector.

A Meccaryn player and his jet pack equipped team attacks targets through the default third-person interface.

The real-time strategy elements of Giants consist of base building and resource gathering, wherein the resources are small humanoids called Smarties. There are a limited number of Smarties in a mission, and players must rush to gather them, or kidnap them from each other to gain an advantage. Players also gather sustenance for the Smarties to make them work; Meccaryn and Reaper players hunt the cattle-like Vimps for meat and souls respectively. The options in building a base are limited; players can neither choose the locations for the structures nor manage their workforce in detail. Players in control of Kabuto need not build a base; instead, the character gains strength and produces subordinate characters by hunting for food. Kabuto consumes Smarties to increase his size and power; at maximum size, he can produce smaller Tyrannosaurus-like units as subordinates. To restore his health, Kabuto eats Vimps and other units (player- and computer-controlled).

Multiplayer mode allows a maximum of five Meccaryn, three Sea Reaper, and one Kabuto player(s) to play in each session. Due to the lack of a game server browser, players connect through online services MPlayer or GameSpy Arcade for the Windows version, and GameRanger for the Mac OS X version. Besides the standard "destroy all enemy bases and units" missions, the multiplayer mode includes deathmatches and "Capture the Smartie (flag)"-type games. Players are permitted either to start with a full base or to build one from foundations.

== Plot ==
The game world of Giants is set on a fictional "Island" traveling through space. Its surface comprises grasslands, deserts, and forests, surrounded by azure seas. Players have an unobstructed view of the game world to its horizon, whereas distant objects are slightly blurred to convey a sense of distance. Missions for Meccaryns provide cover to hide behind, large spaces of water for Reapers, and creatures for Kabuto to eat.

=== Characters ===
Planet Moon Studios intended for the player characters to provide a varied gameplay experience, laying down requirements to make the characters distinct with unique advantages and disadvantages.

- Meccaryns use high technology and attack as a pack led by the player. Meccaryn players sport guns, explosives, and backpacks that provide special abilities: jet packs allow players to fly over obstacles and outmaneuver opponents, and the "Bush"-pack camouflages the character as a shrub. In single-player mode, players assume the role of Baz, leader of a group of Meccaryns comprising Gordon, Bennett, Tel, and Reg. Several scenarios in the game shows the responsible Baz frustrated with the laxity of Gordon and Bennett, and the inquisitive Tel and Reg.
- Sea Reapers are amphibious, humanoid swimmers. Therefore, they regain health in contact with water, and the game's Piranhas do not attack them. To travel fast over land, players can "turbo boost" their Reapers to targeted areas. The Reapers can use swords, bows, and spells, such as summoning tornadoes or firestorms, in combat. Planet Moon Studios initially conceived the Sea Reaper single-player character, Delphi, as evil, but later gave her a conscience.
- Kabuto is the title creature of the game, and the only one of his race. In his back-story, the Reapers created him as their guardian, but found him beyond control. Creative director Tim Williams gave the "Citizen" title to Kabuto for its allusion to the character's wish for a sense of belonging to the Island. The game developer modeled Kabuto's attacks after those of giant monsters in classic monster movies, allowing him to use professional wrestling attacks and aerial techniques such as elbow drops, foot stomps, and the "butt flop" described as "like the body slam, but with less dignity". To balance his strength, a weak point at his waist inflicts heavy damage when struck. Players playing the giant monster can assume a perspective through his mouth to target prey.

For non-playable races, the team designed Smarties to have oversized heads, bulging eyes, and idiotic personalities for comedic effect. Players labor for the Smarties while witnessing their hedonistic indulgences, but the payoff is a "giant gun". Standard enemies include Reaper Guards (male Reapers with no magical ability, who serve as common soldiers), as well as fauna such as the insectoid Rippers, beast-of-burden Sonaks, and bat-like Verms.

=== Story ===
Originally featuring each race in its own distinct story, the single-player mode now depicts a single sequential story wherein the player begins as Baz and must complete a sequence of missions before assuming the role of Delphi. On completion of Delphi's story, the player takes control of a Kabuto character. Williams used cut scenes to introduce and conclude each mission.

As Baz, the player searches for Reg and Tel. Timmy, a Smartie rescued in the first mission, functions as a guide for the player, introducing other Smartie characters and providing exposition of the scenario. The plot portrays the Smarties as suffering under the reign of the Sea Reapers and their Queen Sappho. Alluding to the film The Magnificent Seven, Baz gathers the separated Meccaryns and takes on a quest to solve the Smarties' predicaments. In a climactic cut scene, Sappho sacrifices Timmy to Kabuto, and the young Smartie's grandfather, Borjoyzee, becomes the player's guide. Baz leads an escape from the area and sets up a base to lead a counterattack. Thereafter Delphi becomes the player's character. Yan, the Samurai Smartie, serves as the guide for this story segment, giving instructions on Delphi's abilities. After completing the training missions under Yan, Delphi attacks Sappho's base and the Reapers, eventually confronting the queen in a boss fight. When defeated, Sappho summons Kabuto to destroy the Smarties, but Kabuto eats her instead.

In the final story, Delphi has transformed herself into a Kabuto-like creature to challenge the original. The player wanders around the islands as the Delphi-Kabuto character, searching for prey to increase her size. After Delphi-Kabuto achieves her maximum size, she proceeds to a boss fight with the original Kabuto. Despite her victory, Kabuto revives in a triggered cut scene and restores her Reaper form, whereupon the player takes the role of Baz against the revived monster. After defeating Kabuto, Baz is shown in the final cut scene, flying off to Planet Majorca with Delphi, Borjoyzee, and his fellow Meccaryns.

== Development ==
When five members of Shiny Entertainment's MDK development team broke off to set up Planet Moon Studios in 1997 with software engineer, Scott Guest, they decided to make their first project fun and original, a game with graphics and gameplay unseen at that time. Nick Bruty, Bob Stevenson, and Tim Williams initially conceived the idea of pitting players as spacemen, pirates, and giants against each other and having fun. Initially projected for release in late 1999, the game suffered delays to its development largely due to the illness of their chief programmer, Andy Astor, who was suffering from stage IV mantle cell lymphoma in late 1999. The team realized they needed more resources and by 2000, they had hired two more programmers and an artist. Producing a next-generation game required them to keep up with 1998–2000's rapid advancement of technology, which resulted in further delays. The team upsized the graphic textures as they changed the graphical software to support NVIDIA graphics cards. Planet Moon deemed game engines available during development too restrictive and inappropriate for their requirements, and built their own. Called Amityville, it could support Glide, OpenGL, and Direct3D. The team used it to create the required "lush and vibrant" outdoor environments, and terrain deformation effects.

Planet Moon designed the structure of the single-player mode to be a gradual learning process for the players; the game would introduce new command sets to the players as they progress, and encourage them to repeat using the new commands for that mission. From the start of the project, the team intended the controls to be simple, and mapped commonly used commands to a few keys. Focus groups consisting more than 25 testers went through this design to verify its ease. Planet Moon aimed for a complex artificial intelligence (AI); computer-controlled characters would evade shots and take cover. The enemy AI would plot its actions according to long-term goals. The development team consulted Mark Frohnmayer, lead programmer of the multiplayer game Tribes 2, for advice on implementing the multiplayer portion. To balance the characters in combat, Planet Moon focused on characteristics that could affect the fighting capabilities, instead of tweaking the damage output. The team faced a tight schedule, and abandoned several features initially in the game. Early designs allowed players to change the landscape; they could gorge out water channels and isolate segments of the land by playing as Reapers. The Kabuto character initially could bake mud into "mud shepherd" units and use them to defend its herd of food.

Interplay Entertainment released the Windows version of the game on December 7, 2000. Planet Moon later created a special version of the game optimized for the GeForce 3 graphics card to display water reflections, soft-edged shadows, and weather effects. This version was not sold as a standalone commercial product but as a part of certain GeForce 3 graphic card package deals. A Mac OS X version of the game was developed by The Omni Group; they rewrote the game's software to take advantage of the symmetric multi-processing capability of Mac OS X. MacPlay released the port on October 25, 2001. Multiplayer mode was initially disabled in the retail release but was re-inserted in a later patch. Giants was also ported to the PlayStation 2 (PS2), a process overseen by Interplay's division, Digital Mayhem, who posted updates of their progress on IGN. Their greatest challenge for the PS2 port was converting and storing the special effects of the Windows version onto the lesser storage space of the PS2. LightWave 3D was used by the team to convert the graphic resources. Although they had to reduce the image resolution, Digital Mayhem increased the number of polygons that composed the player character models, making them smoother and more detailed in shape. Due to the limited capabilities of the PS2 as compared to the Windows platform and the addition of a save feature, the team focused on enhancing the action gameplay, streamlining the interfaces, and tweaking the Reaper ski races, level designs, and game balance. They redesigned the controls for the PS2's controller, and after finding the analog sticks less easy to aim with than a mouse, implemented a feature to help the player's aim. Digital Mayhem originally intended to retain the multiplayer mode, but discarded it, believing the PS2 environment could not generate the same multiplayer atmosphere as the Windows platform. Interplay released the PS2 port on December 21, 2001. They also announced plans for an Xbox port but nothing resulted from this.

The uncensored Delphi with Yan the Samurai Smartie

Near the release of the United States (US) Windows version of the game, Planet Moon failed to obtain a "Teen" rating from the ESRB despite changing the original red blood to green and covering Delphi's toplessness with a bikini top. They made the changes to broaden retail opportunities because many large retailers in the US refused to sell "Mature"-rated games; Wal-Mart reiterated in October 2002 that they would never stock their shelves with software that contained vulgarity or nudity. Planet Moon Studios later released a patch that reverted the color of the blood to red, and computer gamers found they could restore Delphi's toplessness by deleting a file.

Interplay offered a bonus disc containing extra multiplayer levels to those who pre-ordered the Windows version of the game. In October 2003, they offered the game's soundtrack to those who purchased Giants from their online store. Composers Mark Snow (noted for his The X-Files musical scores), Mark Morgan, and Jeremy Soule (both known for the music of several video games) were involved in the music for Giants. Interplay hired Morgan to compose the scores, although reports showed they initially hired Snow for the task. Morgan, however, could not fully concentrate on the task for personal reasons and handed it over to Soule. Closing credits of the game listed only Morgan and Soule, and Soule compiled their works onto the original soundtrack of the game. Soule originally offered to autograph the soundtrack on its release in the United States, but he stopped his offer when email feedback revealed many were intending to pirate his work through the peer-to-peer file sharing software Napster instead of buying it.

== Reception ==
Reception

Aggregate score
Aggregator	Score		
Aggregator	Macintosh	PC	PS2
Metacritic		85/100	79/100

Review scores
Publication	Score		
Publication	Macintosh	PC	PS2
GameRevolution		B−	C+
GameSpot		9.0/10	8.3/10
IGN		9.2/10	8.0/10
Next Generation		4/5	4/5
Macworld UK	4/5		
Mac Guild	3/5		

Awards
Publication	Award
IGN	Action Game of 2000 – Editor's Choice
Game Guru	Game of the Year 2000
Game Guru	Action Game of the Year 2000
GameSpot	Best Graphics, Technical of 2000

Planet Moon Studios' blending of two genres in Giants has earned the acclaim of reviewers. Game Revolution and GameSpot found the simplified real-time strategy task of resource gathering in Giants more interesting than tedious, and Troy Dunniway, Microsoft's Head of Game Design in 2002, commented that the real-time strategy elements enhanced the game's shooter aspect rather than making it a hybrid of two genres. Sci Fi Weekly was impressed that both styles of play never interfered with each other, which was complemented by the unique gameplay of each race. The Entertainment Depot, however, found the base building in several missions tedious; they said the player had to rebuild the base several times due to being forced to leave the base defenseless, which allowed the enemy destroy the structures.

Reviewers commented that the imaginative character designs and use of advanced graphics technology, such as hardware transform and lighting, and bump mapping, made the graphics of the game unrivaled in its time; ActionTrip was so impressed by the game's visuals that they thought their graphics card was supporting the complex hardware environmental bump mapping it was incapable of. The animation of Kabuto's antics such as elbow dropping onto tiny enemies, and tossing up and catching food with his mouth, in particular, won the praises of reviewers. Many critics, however, were disappointed that the computer versions of the game could not run smoothly at full details on the recommended system specifications.

The AI in the game was also the subject of much commentary. Reviewers said they needed to prompt the allied non-player characters to perform actions on several occasions, although the allied AI performed pretty well most of the time. FiringSquad disagreed, calling their computer controlled teammates worthless and finding joy in leaving them to their deaths. The game review site thought the same of the enemy AI, a view echoed by IGN; enemies were unaware of the deaths of nearby teammates, and kept running into obstacles. ActionTrip, however, stated that the enemy AI did well enough to take cover or flee when hurt, and constantly attack the player's base.

Many reviewers found the best part of Giants to be its bawdy humor; the scenes were "bizarre and funny without ever letting the silliness distract or annoy the player". FiringSquad claimed the humor kept them plowing through the game regardless of the issues they encountered and were disappointed when the game steadily lost this approach in the later stages. Mac Guild and Macworld UK, however, considered the humor crude on a childlike level and its delivery forced. In spite of the humor, many reviewers found themselves bored by the monotony and slow pace of certain segments. According to ActionTrip, Giants lacked a unique quality to capture attention, compared to its contemporaries such as American McGee's Alice, MechWarrior 4: Vengeance, and Sea Dogs.

The frequent crashes of the retail Windows versions infuriated many reviewers; Game Revolution censured Interplay for focusing on censoring the game for marketing purposes instead of testing for and fixing the software bugs before release. Several reviewers could not connect to multiplayer games due to failed connections or bugs. The reviewers who managed to play online, commented the games were fun, although they were occasionally disconnected or lagged. Several reviewers declared that the computer versions of the game was flawed for not implementing an in-game save feature.

Reviewers appreciated the PS2 version for including the asked-for save feature, but complained the ported game retained the AI and level design issues associated with the Windows version. IGN remarked that it looked less impressive than the computer versions. The lower resolution, flat textures, washed out colors, and sparser environments made the game average looking. The PS2 version also exhibited clipping issues; character models and projectiles would pass through objects on occasion. The game reviewer, however, praised the console version for presenting a smooth animation, rarely dropping frames. On the contrary, other reviewers stated the frame rate dropped when there are several objects on the screen, presenting a heavy load on the graphics engine. The lack of replay value for the console version after completing the single player mode was a common complaint among the reviewers.

Daniel Erickson for Next Generation gave it four stars out of five for PC version. He was positive to its graphics and gameplay and called it a "brilliantly conceived", "beautiful" epic game.

Scott Steinberg for Next Generation gave it four stars out of five for PlayStation 2, and stated that it was a well made conversion of the original game for computers.

Review aggregators Metacritic and GameRankings calculated scores of 85 and 86.7% from their selected reviews for Giants as of 2007. Although most critics had awarded high scores to the game, GamesRadar and GSoundtracks reported the Windows version sold poorly. In contrast, the Mac OS X version sold out within months of its release, in spite of its smaller market base. According to the quarterly sales reports by NPDFunWorld, the PS2 version sold 11,272 copies in the US for the six months since its release. This is a poor sales figure compared to the 51,726 copies of Shadow Hearts and 753,251 copies of Max Payne sold in the same period for the PS2. Despite the poor overall sales, reviewers have nominated Giants as a game deserving a sequel, and have kept it on PC Gamer UK's Top 100 as of 2007. In 2009, Andrew Groen of GameZone ran a retrospective on Giants and suggested that the game's mix of humor and action inspired later games such as Ratchet & Clank and Jak and Daxter. He further commented that games of 2004-09 were influenced by Giants in one way or another.

== Possible sequel ==
In September 2015, the independent studio Rogue Rocket Games, co-founded by Nick Bruty, former Planet Moon Studios founder, started a Kickstarter campaign for developing a new independent crowd-funded game said to be "the spiritual successor of Giants: Citizen Kabuto", titled First Wonder. As of February 2016, the Kickstarter did not reach its goal and the spiritual successor was cancelled, despite being greenlit on Steam.
