= Trantor: The Last Stormtrooper =

1987 video game

- Developers: Probe Software; Erbe Software (Spain)
- Publisher: Go!
- Platforms: ZX Spectrum, Commodore 64, Amstrad CPC, Atari ST, MS-DOS, MSX
- Release: 1987
- Genres: Shoot 'em up, platform
- Mode: Single-player

Trantor: The Last Stormtrooper is a video game for the ZX Spectrum, Commodore 64, MSX, Amstrad CPC, and Atari ST released by Go! (a label of U.S. Gold) in 1987. A version for MS-DOS was released by KeyPunch Software. It was produced by Probe Software (the team consisted of David Quinn, Nick Bruty and David Perry). It was released in Spain (as "Trantor") by Erbe Software.

The game is a mix between shoot 'em up and a platform game with large, animated sprites. Bruty, who had previously produced graphics within tight limits on other projects, decided instead to focus on artwork and keep other aspects of the game simple to fit the constraints of the platforms.

== Gameplay ==
The player controls the titular stormtrooper who is the only survivor of the destruction of his spaceship (hence the title). Gameplay revolves around exploring the play-area and collecting code-letters. The play-area consists of several different floors which can be explored freely via connecting lifts. However, Trantor is up against a very strict time limit.

The levels are infested by various aliens and small flying robots which sap Trantor's strength if he touches them. Fortunately, Trantor is armed with a flamethrower with which to destroy these pests. Unfortunately, fuel for this is limited although he can re-fill this at fuel-points located on many of the floors.

Whenever Trantor finds a code-letter, his timer countdown is reset and then counts down again until he finds another letter. For this reason, much of the gameplay is a race-against-time.

There are also lockers scattered around the floors which contain pick-ups to assist Trantor. These include hamburgers (restore strength) and clocks (resetting the time, as finding a code letter would).

The game ends when Trantor's energy runs out or if the timer reaches zero. The player's performance is shown as a percentage of the game completed, along with a short comment. The comment for nine percent is "Is that you, Fergus?", referring to Probe co-founder Fergus McGovern.

== Opening sequence ==
Trantor was unusual for the time in featuring an animated opening-sequence on loading shown before the main options screen. This shows Trantor's ship (with animated radars) slowly dropping down a shaft before landing. The title character then emerges and is seen to beckon to others to join him before the ship suddenly disintegrates leaving him alone.

== Critical response ==
Reception

Awards
| Publication | Award |
|---|---|
| Sinclair User | SU Classic |
| Your Sinclair | Megagame |

Trantor was generally received with positive reviews, with Your Sinclair giving it 9/10 and calling it "Wonderful entertainment and worth much more than the asking price". Sinclair User's Tony Dillon described the main character's animation as "the most realistic I have seen on any 8-bit computer" and gave the game 10/10.

CRASH, on the other hand, said the "excellent presentation and graphics conceal shallow gameplay" and gave it an overall 68%.
