= Planet Moon Studios =

Video game development company

- Type: Privately held
- Industry: Video games
- Founded: 1997
- Founder: Nick Bruty, CCO; Bob Stevenson, CEO emeritus
- Defunct: 2011
- Fate: Closed
- Headquarters: San Francisco, California, U.S.
- Key people: Aaron Loeb, CEO; Scott Guest, CTO; Ken Capelli, Art director Ellie White, Dir. operations Tim Williams, Creative Director/Head writer emeritus Andy Astor, Lead programmer emeritus
- Products: Giants: Citizen Kabuto; Armed and Dangerous
- Website: planetmoon.com (archived)

Planet Moon Studios was a game development studio based in San Francisco, California founded by ex-Shiny Entertainment developers Nick Bruty (President) and Bob Stevenson (CEO) in 1997. The founding members were then known for creating the third-person shooter video game MDK.

== History ==
Shortly after its founding, the developer signed a multi-game deal with publisher Interplay Entertainment, despite the fact that it had yet to announce its first game or even decide on a name for the company.

Planet Moon developed the games Giants: Citizen Kabuto (Interplay, 2000) and Armed and Dangerous (LucasArts, 2003) The games are critically well received and are often lauded for their humor in various reviews.

In January 2011, Bigpoint Games acquired the Planet Moon Studios staff in San Francisco, California, but did not acquire the company, its intellectual properties, or its other assets. Shortly thereafter, Planet Moon Studios closed its doors.

=== Games ===
Year	Title	Platform(s)
2000	Giants: Citizen Kabuto	Windows, PS2
2003	Armed and Dangerous	Windows, Xbox
2005	Infected	PSP
2007	After Burner: Black Falcon	PSP
2007	Smarty Pants	Wii
2008	Battle of the Bands	Wii
2008	Booty Blocks	iPhone/iPod Touch
2008	Brain Quest Grades 3 & 4	DS
2008	Brain Quest Grades 5 & 6	DS
2009	Drawn to Life: The Next Chapter	Wii
2010	Tangled: The Video Game	DS, Wii
