= Kabuto Station =

Kabuto Station is the name of multiple train stations in Japan:

- Kabuto Station (Fukushima) (兜駅)
- Kabuto Station (Ishikawa) (甲駅) (closed)
- Kabuto Station (Mie) (加太駅)
