= Mount Kabuto =

Mountain in Japan

- 甲山
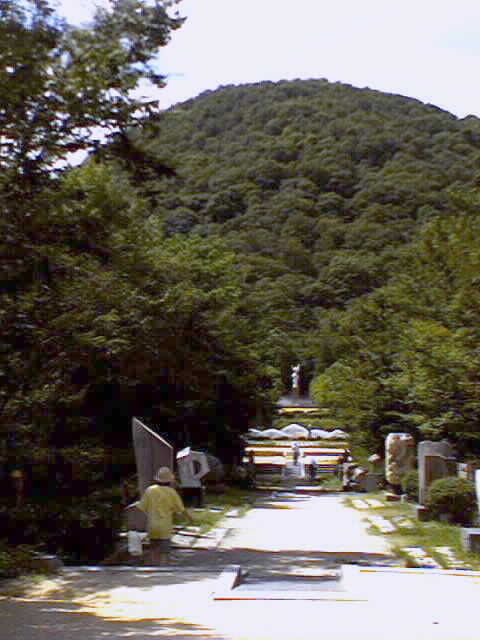
- A view of Mt. Kabuto

Highest point
- Elevation: 309.2 m (1,014 ft)
- Coordinates: 34°46.29′N 135°19.46′E

Naming
- Pronunciation: Japanese: [kaꜜbutojamaꜜ]

Geography
- Location: Nishinomiya, Hyōgo, Japan
- Parent range: Rokko Mountains

Geology
- Mountain type: A monadnock of an old volcano

Mount Kabuto (甲山, Kabuto-yama) is a mountain in Nishinomiya, Hyōgo, Japan. It is located in the east end of the Rokko Mountains, and the height is 309.2m.

== Outline ==
Mount Kabuto is a famous picnic spot in the Kansai metropolitan area. It is a monadnock of an extinct volcano that was estimated to have last erupted about 12,000,000 years ago. The mountain is in Kabutoyama Forest Park.

== History ==
The mountain is shaped like a helmet, 'kabuto' in Japanese. It has a long history as an object of worship by people around the mountain. Kanno-ji in the middle of the mountain is the place of worship of the mountain.

According to Japanese myth, it is understood that because Empress Jingū buried her helmet when she went to subjugate Silla, a dynasty in the Korean Peninsula, this mountain was named 'Kabutoyama', literally "helmet mountain."

== Access ==
- Nigawa Station of Hankyū Imazu Line
- Kōyōen Station of Hankyū Kōyō Line

== Gallery ==
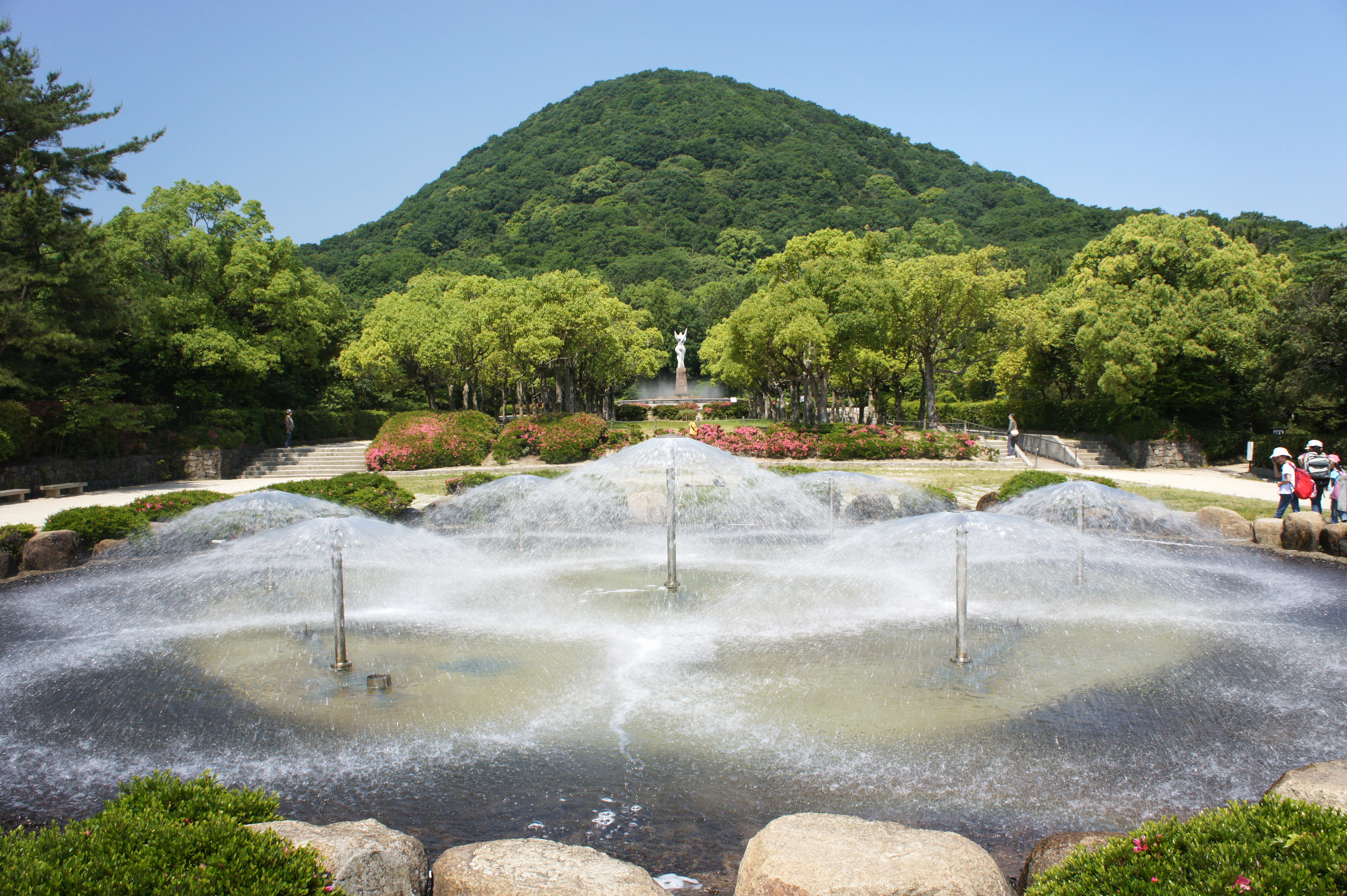
Mount Kabuto from Kabutoyama Forest Park (1) (6/2010)

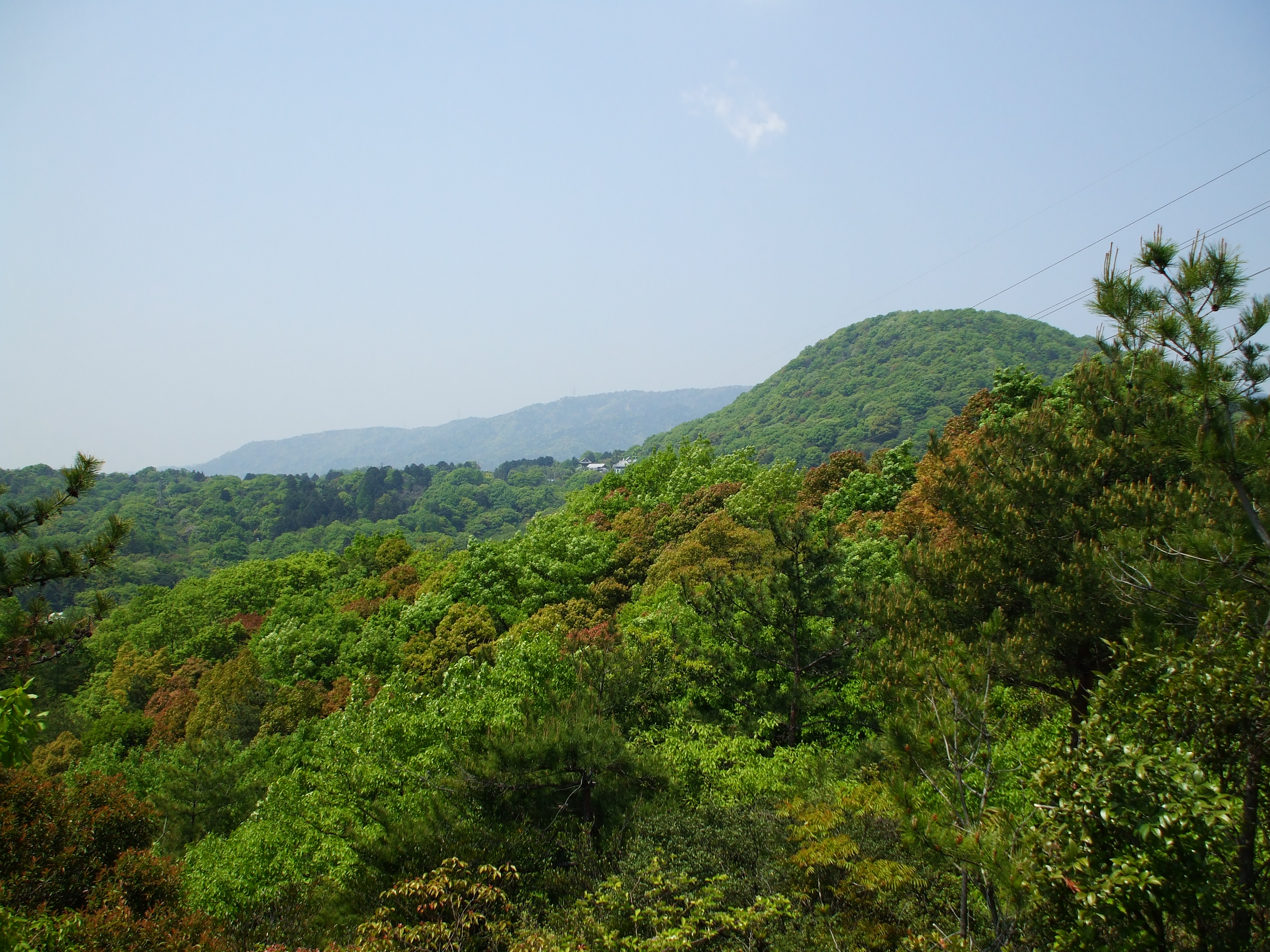
Mount Kabuto from Kabutoyama Forest Park (2) (4/2009)

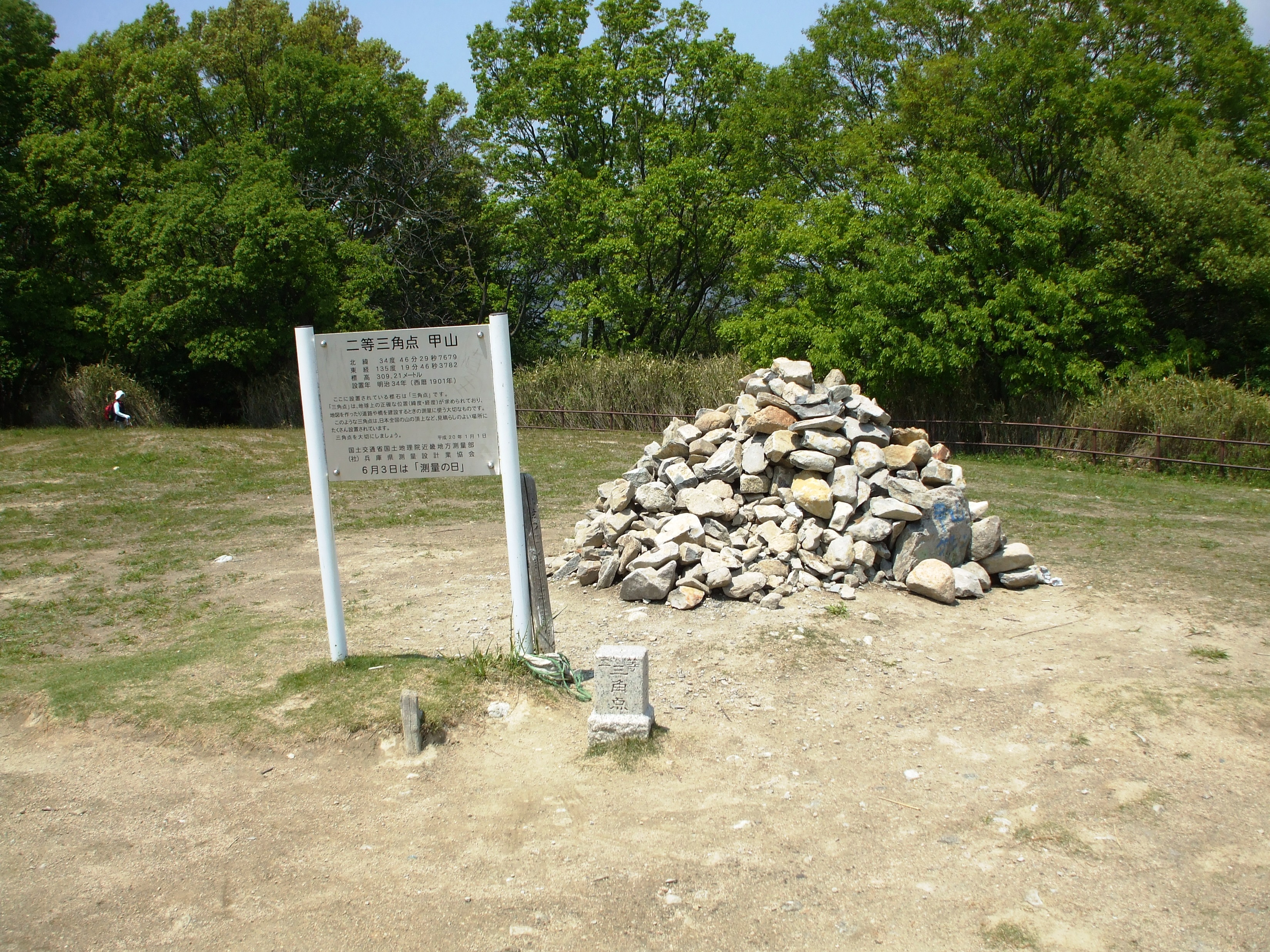
The top of Mount Kasagata (4/2009)

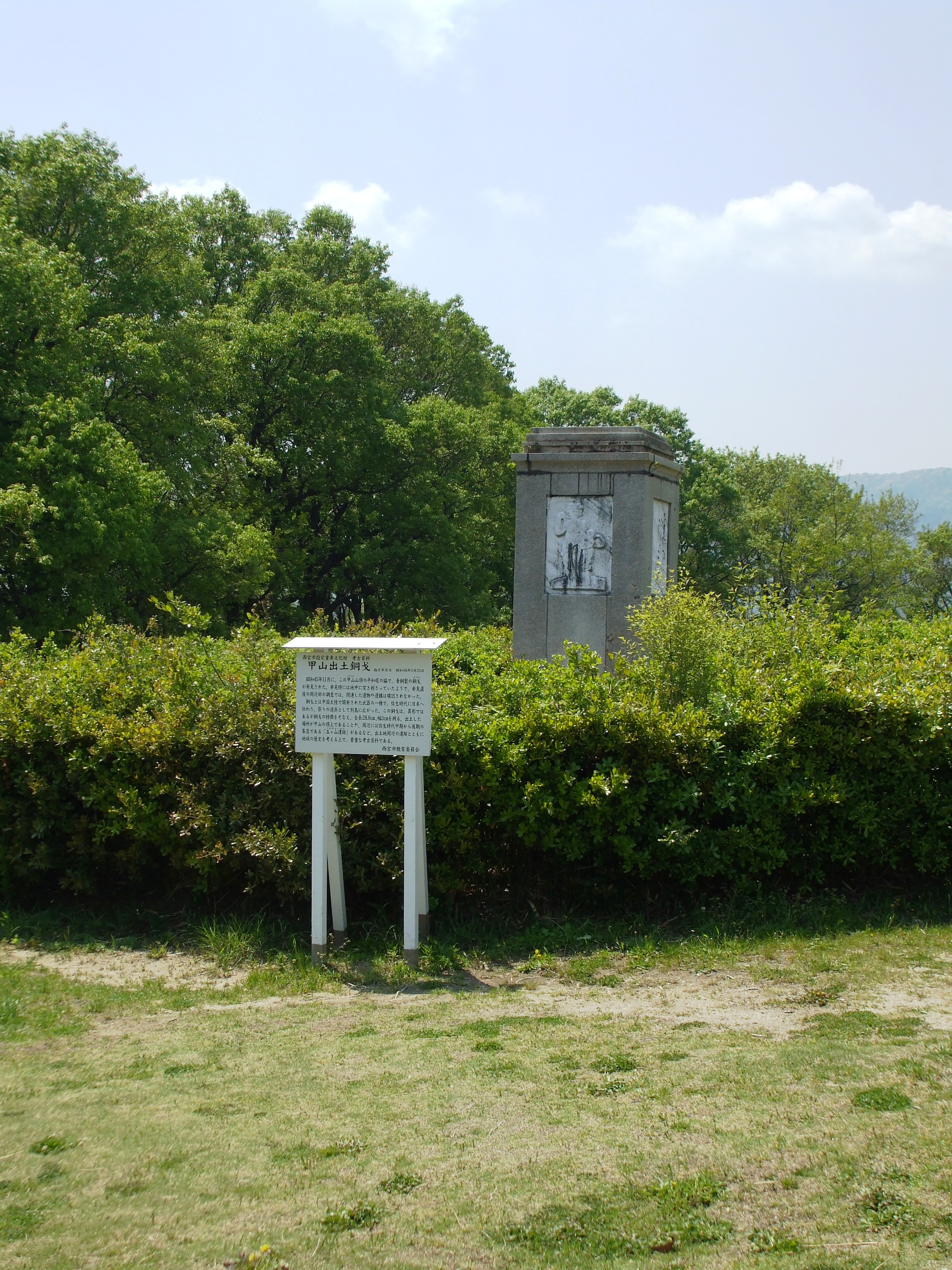
A view at the top of Mount Kabuto (1) (4/2009)

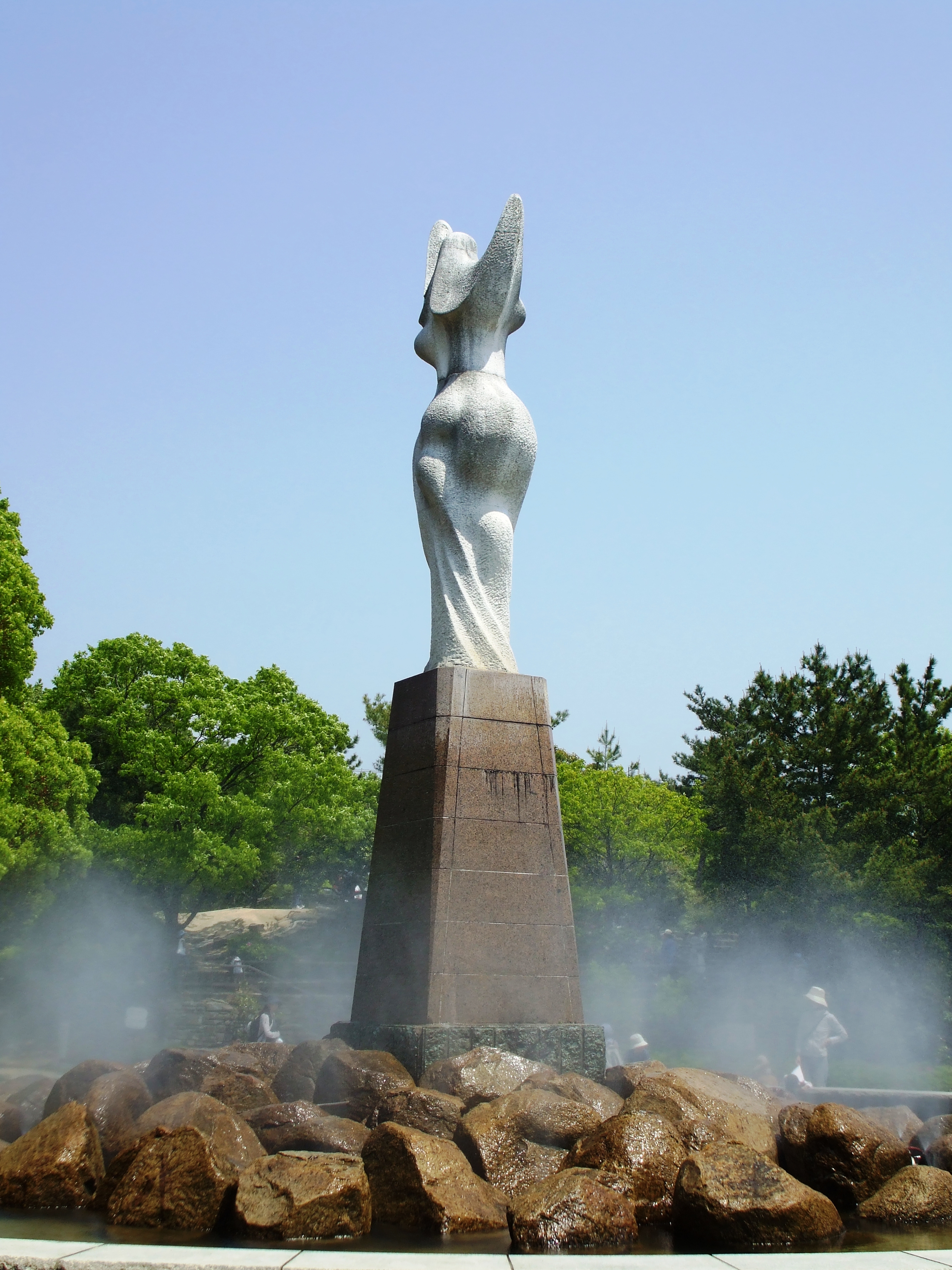
An object of Kabutoyama Forest Park (4/2009)

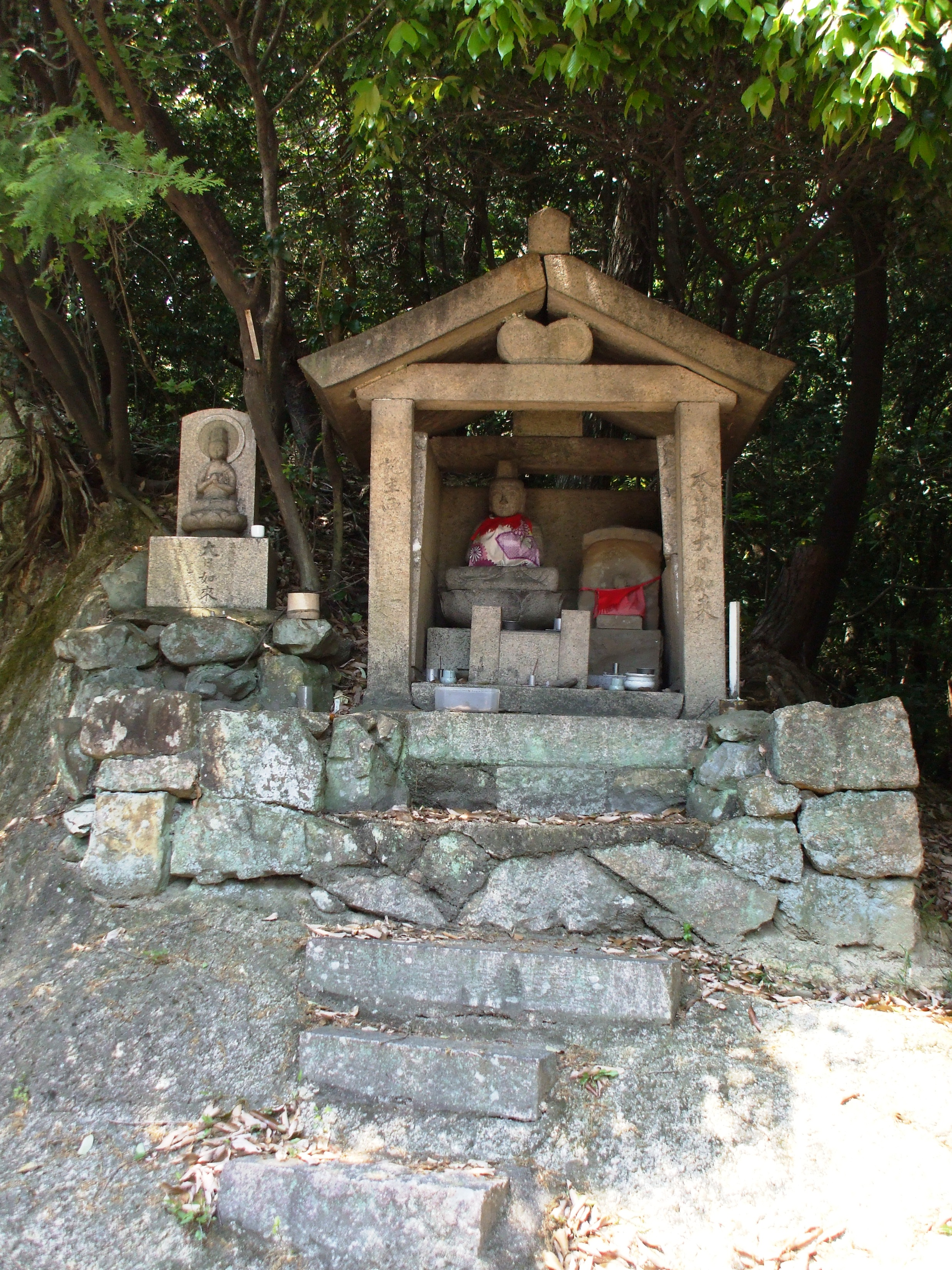
Religious Objects in Mount Kabuto (4/2009)

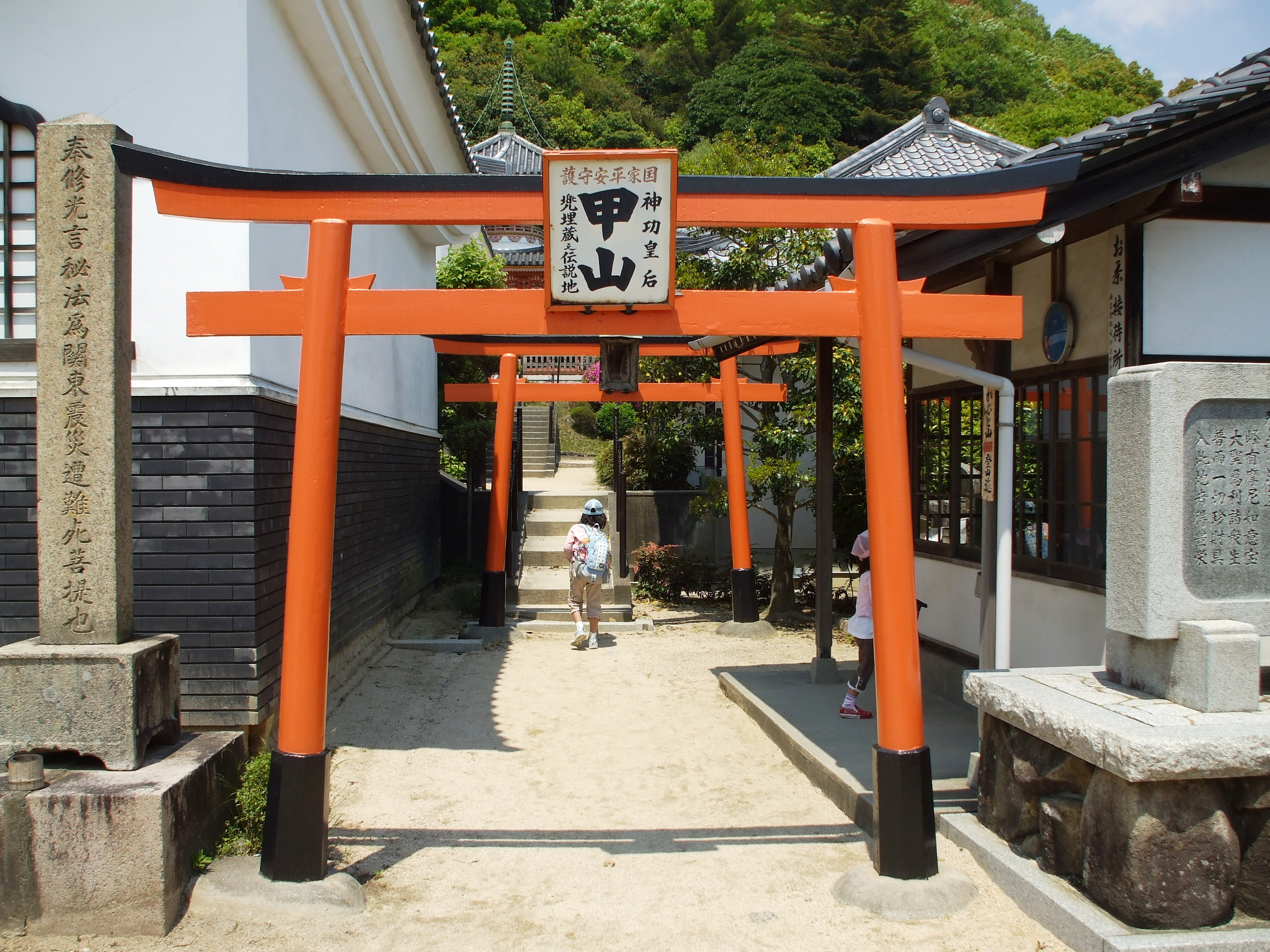
An entrance to Mount Kabuto (4/2009)

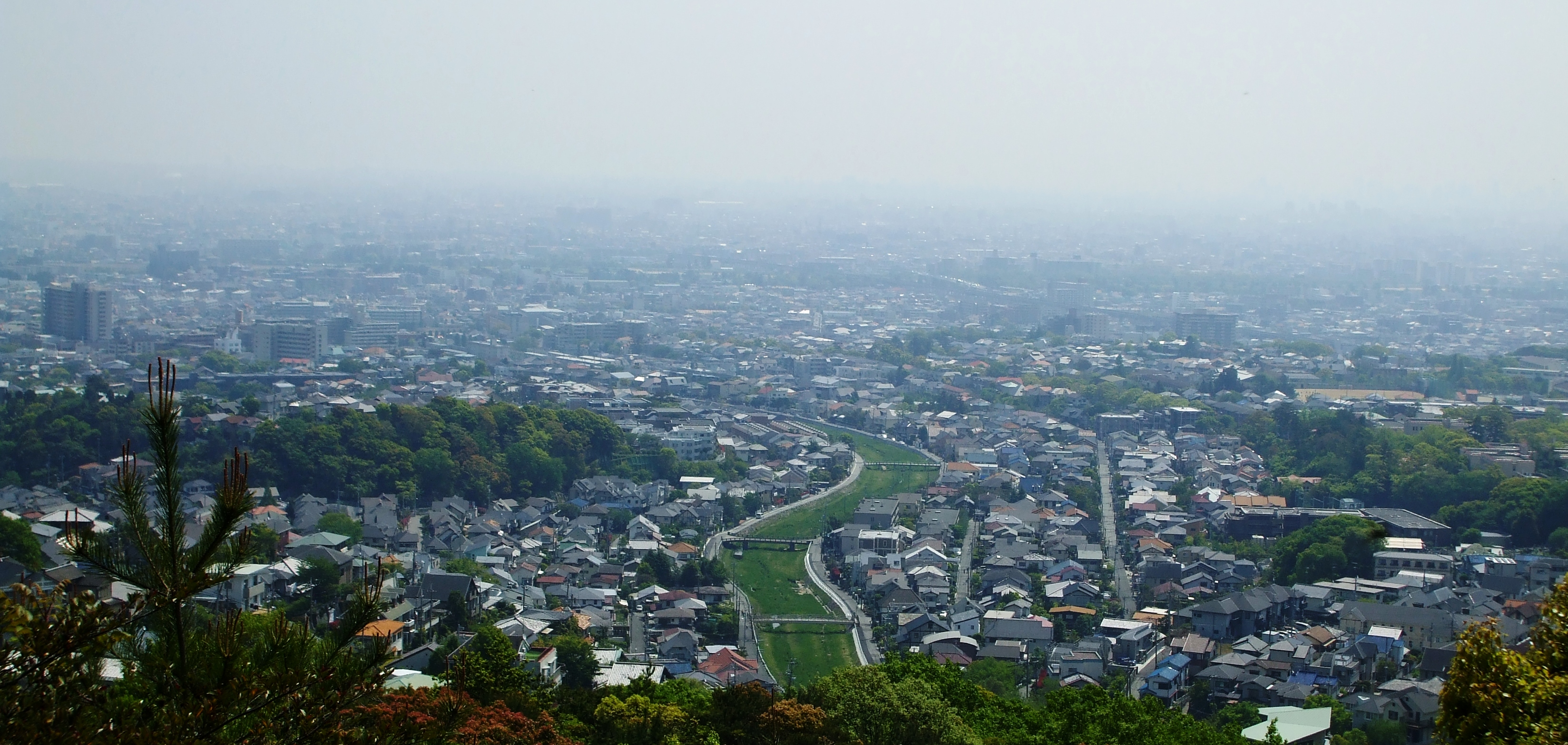
Osaka Plain from Kabutoyama Forest Park (4/2009)

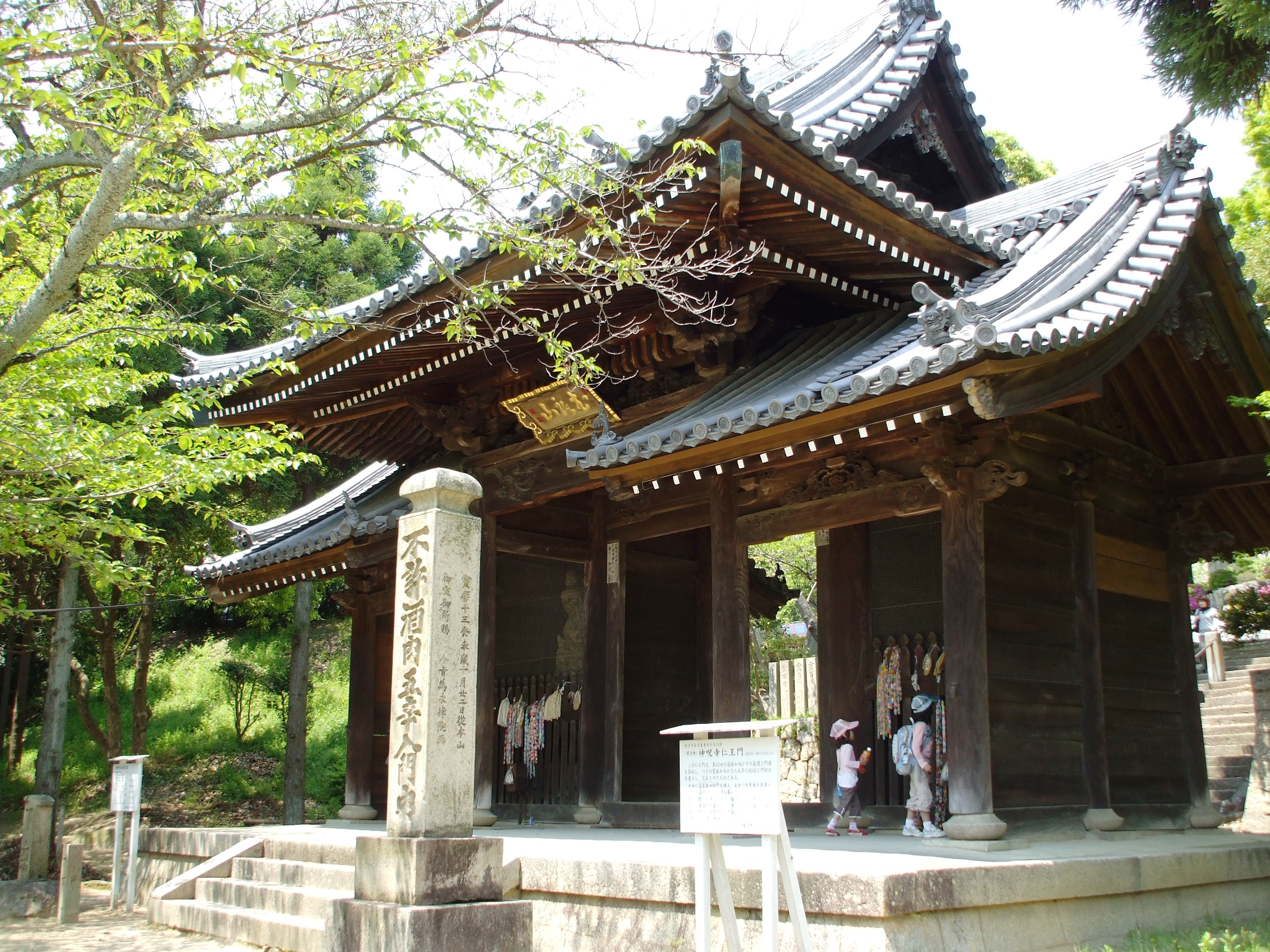
Kanno-ji temple, place for worship of Mount Kabuto (4/2009)

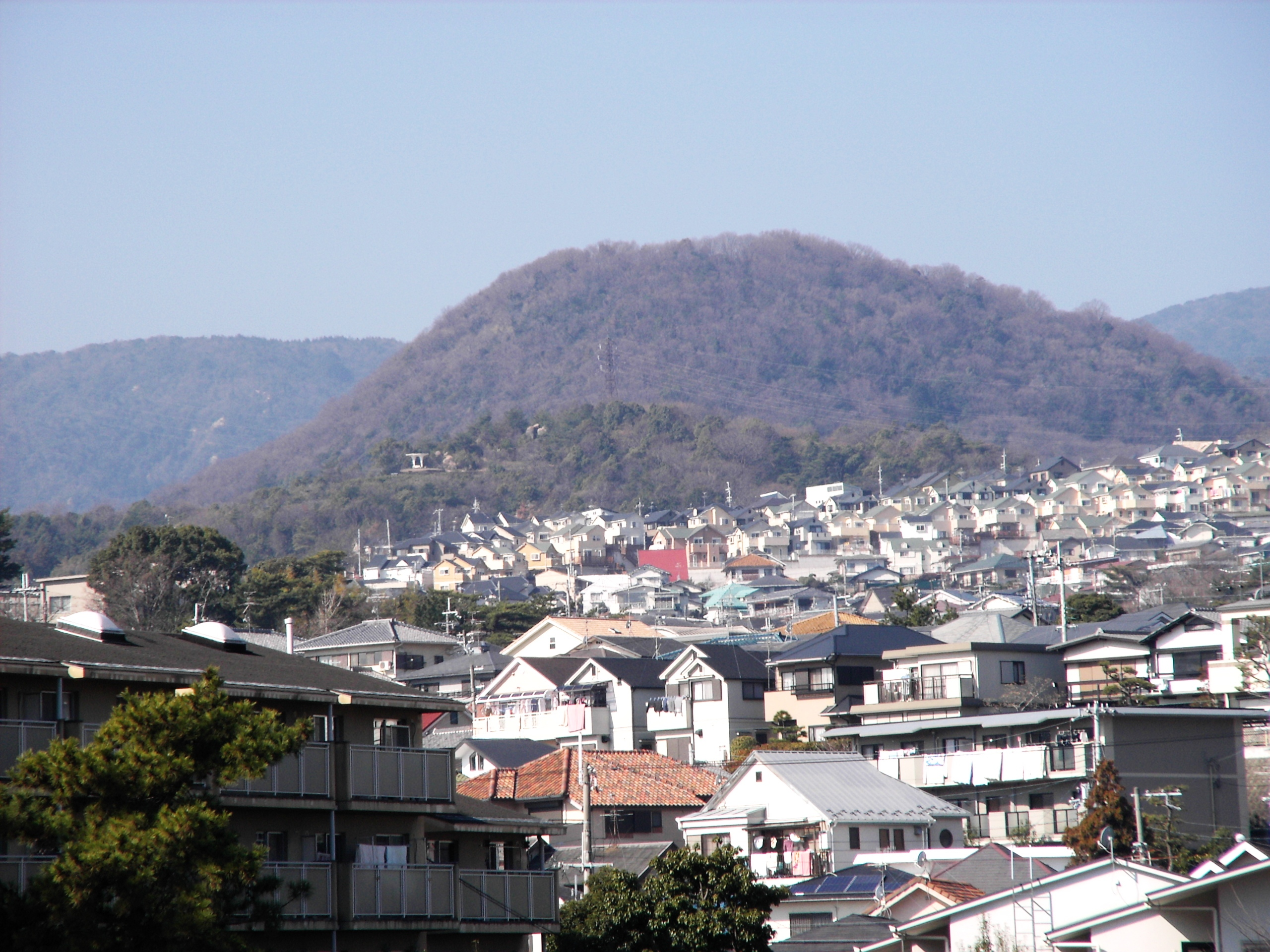
Mount Kabuto from Bentenike Pond (5/2007)
