= Rakuda Glacier =

Glacier in Antarctica

- Location of Queen Maud Land in Antarctica

- Location within Antarctica
- Location: Queen Maud Land
- Coordinates: 68°3′S 43°54′E
- Thickness: unknown
- Status: unknown

Rakuda Glacier (68°3′S 43°54′E) is a glacier flowing to the coast just east of Rakuda Rock in Queen Maud Land. Mapped from surveys and air photos by Japanese Antarctic Research Expedition (JARE), 1957–62, who gave the name.

Rakuda Rock (68°2′S 43°49′E) is a projecting coastal rock at the west side of Rakuda Glacier in Queen Maud Land. Mapped from surveys and air photos by Japanese Antarctic Research Expedition (JARE), 1957–62, who gave the name.

== See also ==
- Glaciology
- Hikae Rock
- List of glaciers in the Antarctic
