= Kabuto Station (Mie) =

Railway station in Kameyama, Mie Prefecture, Japan

Kabuto Station 加太駅
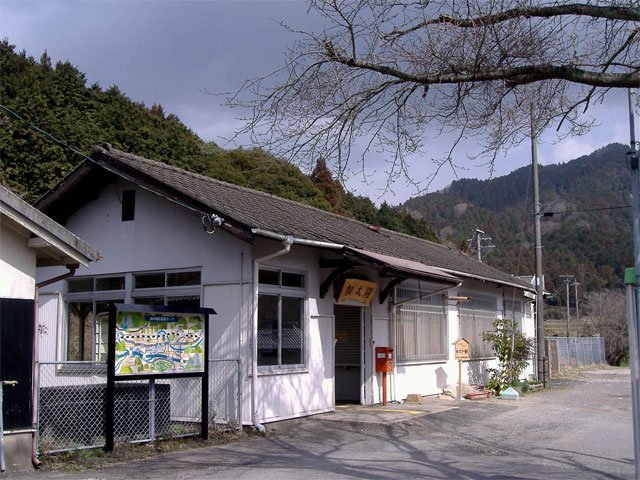
- Kabuto Station

General information
- Location: 1622, Ichiba, Kabuto, Kameyama-shi, Mie-ken 640-0103; Japan
- Coordinates: 34°50′33″N 136°20′25″E
- System: JR-West regional rail station
- Owner: West Japan Railway Company (JR-West)
- Lines: Passenger train services: V Kansai Main Line; Railway track: Kansai Main Line
- Distance: 11.1 km (6.9 miles) from Kameyama
- Platforms: 1 side platform and 1 converted side platform
- Tracks: 2
- Train operators: JR-West
- Bus stands: 1
- Connections: Kameyama City Community Bus: Kabuto District Wellfare Bus

Construction
- Structure type: At grade
- Cycle facilities: Available
- Accessible: None

Other information
- Status: Unstaffed
- Website: Official website

History
- Opened: 21 September 1896

Passengers
- 2019: 48 daily
Services
Preceding station	JRW	Following station
Tsuge toward Kamo and Iga-Ueno	Kansai Line	Seki toward Kameyama
Location
- Location within Mie Prefecture Location within Japan

Kabuto Station (加太駅, Kabuto-eki) is a passenger railway station of the West Japan Railway Company (JR-West) located in the city of Kameyama, Mie, Japan.

== Lines ==
Kabuto Station is served by the Kansai Main Line, and is located 71.1 rail kilometres from the terminus of the line at Nagoya Station and 11.1 rail kilometres from Kameyama Station.

== Layout ==
The station consists of a side platform and a converted side platform serving two tracks, connected by a footbridge.

=== Platforms ===
Westbound	■ Kansai Line	for Kamo and Iga-Ueno
Eastbound	■ Kansai Line	for Kameyama

== History ==
Kabuto Station was opened on September 21, 1896, with the extension of the Kansai Railway from Yokkaichi Station to Tsuge Station. The Kansai Railway was nationalized on October 1, 1907, becoming part of the Imperial Government Railways (IGR), which became Japan National Railways (JNR) after World War II. Freight operations were discontinued from October 1, 1962. With the privatization of JNR on April 1, 1987, the station came under the control of JR-West.

== Passenger statistics ==
In fiscal 2019, the station was used by an average of 48 passengers daily (boarding passengers only).

== Surrounding area ==
- Shinpuku-ji
- Kabuto River

== See also ==
- List of railway stations in Japan
