= Background level =

Background level may refer to:

- Background (astronomy)
- Background radiation
- Journalism sourcing

== See also ==
- Background (disambiguation)
