= Jan Fields =

American business executive

Jan Fields is an American business executive, who has served as president of McDonald's USA and who has served on the board of directors for numerous corporations. Fields held every role in the management chain of McDonald's, beginning as a crew member, before becoming the president of McDonald's USA. She was recognized by Forbes Magazine in 2012 as one of the most powerful women in business and she was listed on The Wall Street Journal's 50 Women to Watch list.

== Bibliography ==
Fields married Doug Wilkins in 1993, and has two children with Wilkins. Fields never completed college. She is interested in the advancement of women in corporate leadership positions.

== Career ==
=== McDonald's ===
Fields started her career in the McDonald's corporation as a crew member at a McDonald's restaurant in Dayton, Ohio, in 1978. Fields applied to McDonald's on a whim after stopping at a McDonald's to get a soda while running early to another job interview. She was hired on the spot after applying.

She worked her way up the organization through the management chain, eventually having held every operations job, including senior vice president of McDonald's Central Division, senior vice president in the former Southeast Division, and regional vice president of the Pittsburgh region. In August of 2006, she was promoted to executive vice president and chief operating officer of McDonald's USA, which made her both the first woman to be COO of McDonald's USA and the highest ranking female executive at McDonald's. As COO, Fields was tasked with accommodating the company growth caused by McDonald's growing menu while simultaneously maintaining customer service.

She was appointed President of McDonald's USA in 2010, where she was responsible for the strategic direction and overall business results of the 14,000 McDonald's restaurants throughout the United States. During her time as president of McDonald's USA, Fields also supervised numerous major projects. These included an expansion of the McCafe beverage menu, which created a $5 billion business, and the reformulation of Happy Meals to be more nutritional by adding more apple slices and removing french fries. Other major projects included the addition of calorie counts to McDonald's menus before the regulation officially arose for fast food chains, and the reimaging of hundreds of restaurants. She also oversaw the National Hiring Day initiative, which added 60,000 workers to McDonald's' workforce, and she handled competitive assessment, strategic planning, and relationships with 2,600 franchisees.

McDonald's fired Fields, effective December 1, 2012, after the McDonald's Corporation saw its first monthly same-store sales decrease in nine years since March 2003. Fields' firing was the first executive action McDonald's took after both U.S. and abroad locations began experiencing slow growth and dwindling consumer confidence. This decision sought to "jump-start sales and fight off intensifying competition," according to the New York Times. However, McDonald's spokeswoman, Heidi Barker Sa Shekhem, asserted that "Don Thompson, the chief executive, and Ms. Fields were longtime friends and had discussed the need for a change at the top. A number of business factors played a role in the decision, but recent sales figures were not among them." Fields was succeeded by previous Executive Vice President and Global Chief Restaurant Officer, Jeff Stratton.

=== Board of directors roles ===
From 2005 to 2013, Fields served on the board of directors of United Cerebral Palsy. In 2007, Fields joined the board of chairs of Catalyst, a nonprofit that builds workplaces for women.

In 2008, Fields was nominated to the board of directors of Monsanto Corp. From 2015 to 2018, she served as the chair of its sustainability and corporate responsibility committee. She was also a member of its compensation, nominating and governance, and executive committees.

From 2010 to 2012, Fields served on the board of directors of The Field Museum.

Fields was re-elected to the board of directors of Chico's FAS Inc. on July 21, 2016, after her initial nomination and assumption of the role in 2013. Fields is also a member of its executive committee, and since 2015, she has served as the chair of the nominating and governance committee of Chico's FAS Inc. While serving Chico's, Fields has aimed to recruit diverse board members for the corporation, despite noting the struggle to obtain such candidates, because "there is more competition when companies are seeking diverse candidates."

Fields also served on the board of directors of Buffalo Wild Wings Inc. from 2017 to 2018, and was nominated as its chairperson from August 2017 to February 2018. While she served as chairperson, Fields played a major role in their acquisition of Arby's in 2018.

In 2018, Fields was nominated to Welbilt Inc.'s board of directors, and she has served as a member of its nominating and governance committee and its compensation committee. From January 16, 2019, until 2020, Fields served on the board of directors of Taubman Centers, Inc. In 2020, Fields was appointed to serve on the board of directors of Alimentation Couche-Tard.

Fields has also been serving on the global board of directors for the Ronald McDonald House Charities Global Brand since 2012.

== Nominations ==
Fields has been featured on numerous business focused media, including Forbes' list of The World's 100 Most Powerful Women, Fortune's 50 Most Powerful Women in Business list, The Wall Street Journal's 50 Women to Watch list, and Crain's Chicago Business' list of 25 Women to Watch.
