= Cosmic Force =

Cosmic Force may refer to:

- The force derivable from dark energy responsible for the accelerating expansion of the universe
- God, or supreme deity
  - A term for "God" or "divinity" in panentheistic spirituality
- Unmoved mover, an Aristotelian concept
- A fundamental force or energy postulated in vitalism
- Power Cosmic, a concept in Marvel Comics
- Cosmic Force, a 1993 album by Dennis Brown; see Heartbeat Records

== See also ==
- Cosmos
- Cosmogony
- Cosmology
- Cosmic energy (disambiguation)
