= Figure and ground =

Figure and ground or Figure ground may refer to:

- Figure and ground (media), a concept developed by media theorist Marshall McLuhan
- Figure–ground (perception), referring to humans' ability to separate foreground from background in visual images. Figure-ground perception is one of the main issues in gestalt psychology.
- Figure-ground in map design, the ability to easily discriminate the main figure from the ground

== See also ==
- Background (disambiguation)
- Foreground and background (disambiguation)
