= Background =

Background may refer to:

== Performing arts and stagecraft ==
- Background actor
- Background artist
- Background light
- Background music
- Background story
- Background vocals
- Background (play), a 1950 play by Warren Chetham-Strode

== Recorded works ==
- Background (1953 film), a British drama
- Background (1973 film), a documentary
- Background (TV series), a Canadian journalistic television series
- Background (Lifetime album), 1992
- Background (Bassi Maestro album), 2002

== Science and engineering ==
- Background extinction rate
- Background independence, a condition in theoretical physics
- Background noise
- Background radiation, the natural radiation that is always present in a location
  - Background (astronomy), small amounts of light coming from otherwise dark parts of the sky
  - Cosmic background (disambiguation)
  - Gravitational wave background
  - X-ray background
- Background process, software that is running but not being displayed
- String background
- Computer wallpaper

== Other uses ==
- Background (journalism)
- Cultural heritage
- Ethnic background
- Field (heraldry), background of a shield
- Natural heritage
- Provenance

== See also ==
- Backgrounding, a way of feeding livestock before selling them
- Figure and ground (disambiguation)
- Foreground and background (disambiguation)
- Heritage (disambiguation)
