= Cosmic Owl (disambiguation) =

Cosmic Owl may refer to:

- NGC 2207 and IC 2163, also known as the Cosmic Owl in constellation Canis Major, a pair of colliding spiral galaxies located 80 million light years away (Z=0.009)
- Cosmic Owl in constellation Sextans, a pair of colliding ring galaxies located 8.8 billion light years away (z=1.14), also called the Infinity Galaxy
- Cosmic Owl (Adventure Time), a fictional character from the U.S. animated TV show Adventure Time, a cosmic deity
- Cosmic Owls, a fictional character class from the videogame series Rocketbirds; see Rocketbirds: Hardboiled Chicken

== See also ==
- Cosmic (disambiguation)
- Owl (disambiguation)
