= Big Arch =

Big Arch may refer to:

- Hiroshima Big Arch, a stadium in Japan
- Big Arch (hamburger), a product sold by fast food chain McDonald's

== See also ==
- Large Arch, a sculpture in Columbus, Indiana, United States
- Gateway Arch, a monument in St. Louis, Missouri, United States
