= Big Arch (hamburger) =

Hamburger sold by McDonald's

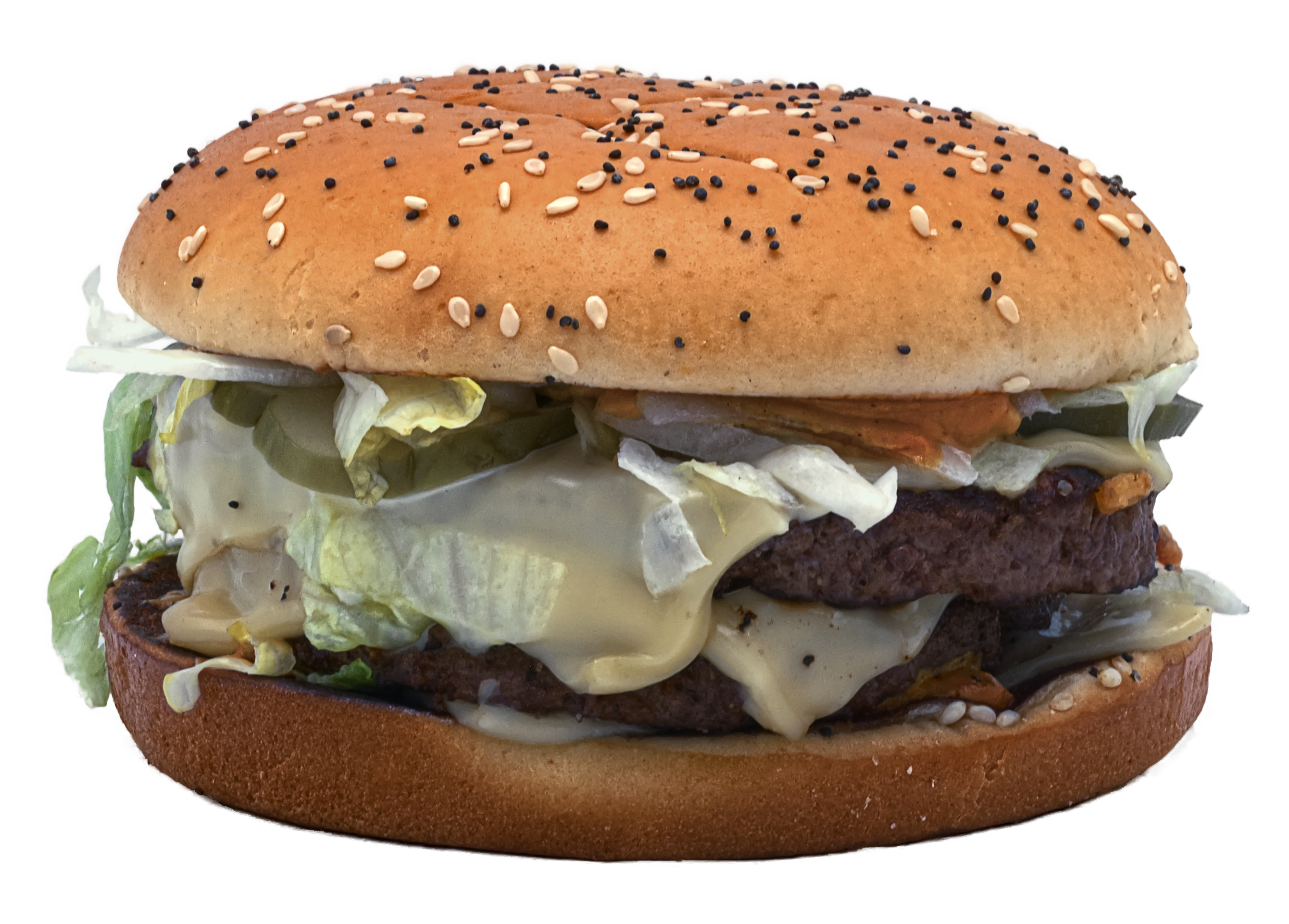
- Type: Hamburger
- Place of origin: United States
- Main ingredients: Beef patty, bun, lettuce, cheddar cheese, onions, pickles

The Big Arch is a hamburger sold by the fast food restaurant chain McDonald's. Intended as a large, high-calorie addition to the core burger menu, it was first trialed in Portugal and Canada in 2024 before being launched in the United Kingdom, Australia and New Zealand in 2025, and the United States and Latvia in 2026.

== History ==
In the early 2020s, McDonald's had been marketing "premium" burgers such as Signature Crafted and Create Your Taste, but found that this strategy was not successful and that burger size was more important to customers than premium quality alone. Tests of larger burgers resulted in the Big Arch, a high-calorie double cheeseburger described as "more satiating" and "something closer to a restaurant-style experience". The Big Arch was first trialed at some stores in Alberta and Ontario in June 2024, followed by all stores in Portugal in July.

McDonald's launched the Big Arch in the United Kingdom in June 2025, in Australia in July 2025, in New Zealand in October 2025, in the United States in March 2026, and Latvia in October 2026.

=== 2026 Chris Kempczinski video ===
In February 2026, ahead of the Big Arch's US launch, McDonald's CEO Chris Kempczinski posted a video of himself reviewing the burger to Instagram. During the video, he appears to take a small bite out of the burger, which he then holds up to the camera declaring "That's a big bite for a Big Arch"; along with repeatedly referring to the burger as a "product". Commentators pointed out that the bite appeared insubstantial and reluctant. It is described in The New York Times as a "missing nibble". Kempczinski does not bite the Big Arch again for the remainder of the video.

The video went largely unnoticed until February 25, when Irish comedian Garron Noone posted a roast reaction to TikTok. Major competitors to McDonald's, as well as smaller local chains, reacted to the video on social media and some shared videos of executives eating their flagship burgers with more enthusiasm.

== Product ==
The Big Arch is a double cheeseburger; the two beef patties weigh the same as those on the Double Quarter Pounder/McRoyal. The burger contains three slices of white cheddar, raw and crispy fried onions, lettuce, pickles and "Big Arch sauce". The bun is seeded with both sesame and poppy seeds. It is the heaviest burger currently served at McDonald's, at 395g and 1,020 calories.

McDonald's describes the sauce as a mixture of "mustard, pickle and sweet tomato flavors". It is primarily based on tomato paste (the burger does not include a tomato slice). The sauce also contains oil, vinegar, sugar, egg yolk, salt and other flavors including paprika, turmeric and lemon. Customers describe the sauce as "tart and creamy" and do not perceive it as spicy.
