= Cosmic =

Cosmic commonly refers to:

- The cosmos, a concept of the universe

Cosmic may also refer to:

== Media ==
- Cosmic (album), an album by Bazzi, 2018
- Cosmic (EP), by Red Velvet, 2024
- Cosmic (novel), a 2008 novel by Frank Cottrell-Boyce
- "Cosmic" (song), a song by Red Velvet
- Cosmic (TV series), a Czech science fiction sitcom
- Afro/cosmic music
- Cosmic, an album by Thomas Anders
- "Cosmic", a song by Avenged Sevenfold from the album Life Is But a Dream...
- "Cosmic", a song by Kylie Minogue from the album X
- CosM.i.C, a member of the Swedish rap group Looptroop Rockers

== Science ==
- An electronic medical record software developed by Cambio
- Constellation Observing System for Meteorology, Ionosphere, and Climate
- COSMIC cancer database
- COSMIC functional size measurement

== Other uses ==
- Cosmic Top Secret, a category of classified information used by NATO
- Cosmic ocean, a mythological motif
- COSMIC (desktop environment), a desktop environment developed by System76

== See also ==
- Cosmic background (disambiguation)
- Cosmos (disambiguation)
- CosMc's, a spin-off of McDonald's
- Kosmic, American YouTuber and speedrunner
