= Steve Easterbrook =

British business executive (born 1967)

- Born: Stephen James Easterbrook; 6 August 1967 (age 59); Watford, England
- Education: Watford Grammar School for Boys; St Chad's College, Durham (BSc)
- Occupation: Business executive
- Title: Former president and CEO, McDonald's
- Term: 2015–2019
- Predecessor: Don Thompson
- Successor: Chris Kempczinski
- Children: 3

Stephen James Easterbrook (born 6 August 1967) is a British business executive. From March 2015 to November 2019, he was president and chief executive of McDonald's, the American fast food company.

On 1 November 2019, the board of directors voted to dismiss Easterbrook with immediate effect, due to evidence of a relationship with a staff member, which is a violation of company anti-fraternisation policies.

== Early life ==
Stephen James Easterbrook was born on 6 August 1967 in Watford, England. He grew up in Watford and was educated at Watford Grammar School for Boys. He studied natural sciences at St Chad's College, Durham University, where he played cricket with fellow student Nasser Hussain, who would later become England cricket captain.

== Career ==
After university, he trained as an accountant with Price Waterhouse. Easterbrook first worked for McDonald's in 1993 as a manager in London. In 2011 he left to become CEO of PizzaExpress and then CEO of Wagamama, two British casual dining chains, before returning to McDonald's in 2013.

On 1 March 2015, after being chief brand officer of McDonald's and its former head in the UK and northern Europe, he became the CEO of the company, succeeding Don Thompson, who stepped down on 28 January 2015. For 2016, Easterbrook's total compensation almost doubled to $15.4 million.

Capitalizing on his in-depth knowledge of the food industry, it was announced in September 2022 that Easterbrook had joined the San Antonio-based vegan fast food chain, Project Pollo, as both an investor and adviser.

=== Removal as McDonald's CEO ===
In November 2019, McDonald's board of directors voted to remove Easterbrook as CEO since he had violated corporate policies on personal conduct by entering into a relationship with a company employee. He was replaced as CEO by Chris Kempczinski, who had been president of McDonald's USA.

In August 2020, McDonald's filed suit against Easterbrook, accusing him of lying about the number and extent of his relationships with subordinate employees and seeking to recover his severance package of more than $40 million. The company claimed that Easterbrook had sexual relationships with three women in the year before he was fired and awarded one of these employees stock options worth hundreds of thousands of dollars. Easterbrook was also accused of using his corporate email account to receive and send sexually explicit photos and videos of various women (including the three alleged relationships). The lawsuit is seeking to change the reason for Easterbrook's removal to "for cause", allowing the company to recoup its severance payments.

In December 2021, it was reported that Easterbrook had returned $105 million in cash and stock to the company in one of the largest clawbacks in the history of corporate America. McDonald's said that "Mr. Easterbrook would return equity awards and cash, with a current value of more than $105 million, which he would have forfeited had he been truthful at the time of his termination and, as a result, been terminated for cause." It did not specify the proportion of cash and stock.

In 2023, Easterbrook agreed to SEC imposed punishments around the disclosure of his McDonald's departure, to include a $400,000 fine, and being ineligible to serve as a director or executive for any public company for a period of five years.

== Personal life ==
He is divorced with three children, who, he said in 2010, visit McDonald's two or three times a month. He lives in Illinois, and is a Watford FC football fan.

Business positions
Preceded by Don Thompson	CEO of McDonald's; 2015–2019	Succeeded by Chris Kempczinski
