= Cosmic energy (disambiguation) =

Cosmic energy is a spiritual and alternative medical concept.

Cosmic energy may also refer to:

== Religion and science ==
- Orgone, a pseudoscientific concept
- Shakti, a Hindu philosophical concept
- Cosmic background (disambiguation)
- Cosmic ray, a high-energy particle from outer space

== Arts and entertainment ==
- Cosmic Energy, a 2020 extended play in the Katy Perry discography
- "Cosmic Energy", a song by Kool and the Gang from the 1976 album Love & Understanding
- Power Cosmic, the source of the superpowers of Galactus and the Silver Surfer
