= CosMc's =

Defunct McDonald's restaurant chain

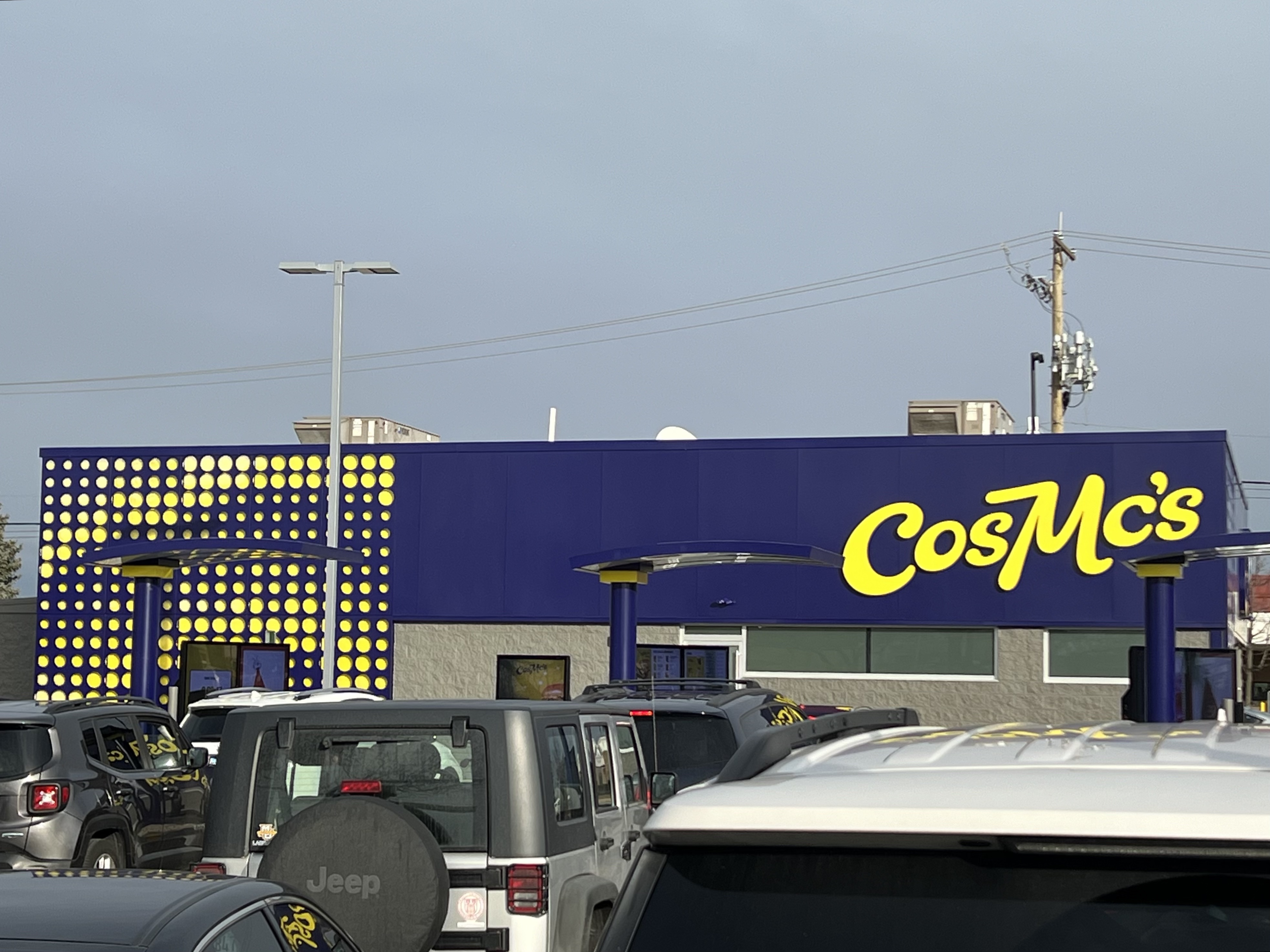
- CosMc's first location in Bolingbrook, Illinois in 2023
- Type: Subsidiary
- Industry: Fast-food restaurant
- Founded: December 7, 2023; 2 years ago Bolingbrook, Illinois, U.S.
- Defunct: May 23, 2025; 17 months ago
- Fate: Closed by parent company
- Successor: McDonald's (Select menu items)
- Headquarters: Chicago, Illinois, U.S.
- Number of locations: 5 locations
- Area served: Illinois, Texas
- Key people: Chris Kempczinski (CEO)
- Products: Iced tea; lemonade; coffee; frappé coffee; slushes; sandwiches; baked goods; ice cream; soda
- Parent: McDonald's
- Website: cosmcs.com (archive)

CosMc's (Note: Pronounced "cosmics") (/ˈkɒz.mɪks/, KAHZ-miks) was an American concept fast food restaurant and spinoff brand by McDonald's. Its menu focused on hot and cold speciality drinks. It launched on December 7, 2023, with a drive-thru only location in the Chicago suburb of Bolingbrook, Illinois. Nine locations were planned to open in Texas in 2024. CosMc's offered McCafe products, some of which are also available at McDonald's locations, alongside exclusive drinks and food.

== History ==
=== Background ===
The name CosMc originated as a McDonaldland character, appearing in McDonald's advertisements from 1986 to 1992. CosMc is an extraterrestrial who "craves McDonald's food." The character occasionally came to steal food for his planet, CosMcland. It also spoke in a mixture of robot-esque sounds and normal speech.

In 2023, McDonald's started focusing more on its classic mascots and the Grimace Birthday Meal became a viral Internet phenomenon. The specialty coffee-selling business had been growing, which McDonald's CEO Chris Kempczinski described as an "attractive and fast growing category". CNN described CosMc's as McDonald's "answer to Starbucks."

=== Launch ===
The chain was announced in July 2023. The first CosMc's store opened on December 7, 2023 in the village of Bolingbrook, Illinois. The opening day saw a large queue of customers in the drive-thru which was the only way to order through the restaurant. CNN reported that the Bolingbrook location saw more than twice the number of visits for a typical McDonald's location, citing data from Placer.ai, with the customer base largely skewed to those aged 22–29.

At the time of launch, McDonald's planned to have ten operational stores, including nine in Texas by 2024. McDonald's CEO Chris Kempczinski said that the company would evaluate the ten stores as a "limited test”, adding "Let's not get too excited." In its first month, the store reportedly had twice the traffic of a regular McDonald's.

A new app and rewards program, CosMc’s Club, along with mobile ordering, was introduced in May 2024.

In early 2025, the company announced it would close three of its larger format locations and open two smaller locations in Texas.

=== Closure ===
McDonald's announced on May 23, 2025, that the CosMc's concept would cease operations at all five remaining locations (four in Texas and one in Illinois). The company indicated that starting one month later, the rewards program, mobile ordering and app would no longer function, and rolling closures of the physical locations would begin. Citing learnings from proofs of concepts at the pilot locations, they expect to test some of the most successful beverage concepts at several mainline McDonald's restaurants. CEO Chris Kempczinski stated that the concept was “quarantining the complexity in a stand-alone concept.” He also stated that brand contradiction, absence of experience, and a steep loss in revenue and sales were the reasons why the concept was shutting down.

== Operations ==
CosMc's was intended to sell afternoon snacks and hot and cold drinks, and was seen as an attempt by McDonald's to enter the United States coffee market and the growing market for drive-thru beverages.

CosMc's outlets had a smaller footprint than a regular McDonald's. It carried a range of products that were not available at regular McDonald's, such as 10 new beverages. It also sold foods available at McDonald's, such as the Egg McMuffin. The first CosMc's shop had four drive thrus.

== Design ==
CosMc's buildings were colored deep violet and had yellow graphics.
