= Chopping (astronomy) =

Astronomical Measurement Technique

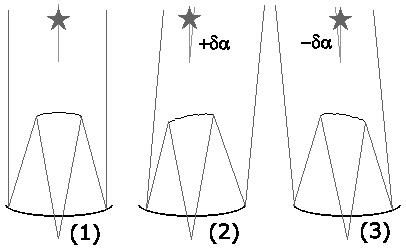
This diagram shows the full cycle of chopping. It first points directly at the object in focus. It then tilts in one direction and then the same distance in the opposite direction.

Chopping is a technique used with infrared telescopes to minimize interference from external or internal heat. The chopper is the mechanism that rocks a mirror (typically a secondary mirror) inside a telescope back and forth in rapid succession because background radiation would change too quickly to measure otherwise.

== Drawbacks ==
There are two major drawbacks to using the method of chopping. First is the variance of the background radiation. This can change when the telescope is shifting between the beams making thing appear strange. Secondly, this method can only be used when the object in question is not too far away, because otherwise it would be out of the telescope's range.

== Infrared Telescopes ==
Main: Infrared telescope

With Infrared Telescopes, chopping is used to eliminate the background radiation by taking pictures at slightly different angles. By comparing separate images, it becomes much easier to tell what the background heat is and what is coming from the object in question. This allows it to be used to gain information about the object that a visible light telescope or a UV telescope can't see.

== Gemini Observatory ==
Main: Gemini Observatory

The Gemini Observatory is a set of two telescopes with one in Hawaii and the other in Chile. Both of these telescopes are infrared and both use chopping to eliminate background radiation. The telescopes chop their secondary mirrors at a rate of 3-5 Hz. Both observatories utilize tilt-tip correction to ensure that the image quality remains crisp. The observatories also received help from the University of Florida to improve its chopping mechanism.

== SOFIA Telescope ==
Main: SOFIA Telescope

The SOFIA Telescope was an infrared telescope integrated into a Boeing 747. This telescope utilized its Second Mirror Assembly (SMA) primarily for chopping and also partially for small corrections. The signals that the SOFIA Telescope would be searching for could be tens of thousands of times less significant than the background emission, so the telescope has an average chopping frequency of 2-5 Hz, but can reach rates of 20 Hz. The chopping action follows a square wave pattern.

== James Webb Space Telescope ==
Main: James Webb Space Telescope

Although the James Webb Space Telescope is an Infrared Telescope, it doesn't use chopping action to prevent interference. Instead, it uses gold-coated mirrors to reflect almost all heat. Additionally, it doesn't use chopping because it is meant to bore into deep space, and the angle would have to be refocused depending on how far away the object is.

== See also ==
- Optical chopper
- Electromagnetic spectrum
