= Don Thompson (executive) =

American engineer and business executive (born 1963)

- Born: Donald Thompson; March 30, 1963 (age 63); Chicago, Illinois, U.S.
- Education: Purdue University, 1984, B.S. (electrical engineering)
- Occupations: Electrical engineer, Northrop Grumman (1985–1990); McDonald's Executive (1990–2015); CEO, McDonald's Corporation (2012–2015); Board of directors Beyond Meat
- Predecessor: James A. Skinner
- Successor: Steve Easterbrook

Donald Thompson (born March 30, 1963) is an American engineer and business executive who was the president and chief executive of McDonald's Corporation from 2012 until 2015. He announced on January 28, 2015, that he would retire from the company and leave his position on March 1, 2015, and was succeeded by Steve Easterbrook, the senior executive vice president and chief brand officer. He is currently the CEO of Cleveland Avenue, an investment group and accelerator that focuses on building new food, beverage, and restaurant concepts, which he founded in 2015. Cleveland Avenue has invested in Beyond Meat and Taste 222, among other food industry companies, and Thompson has served as a member of the board of directors at Beyond Meat since October 2015.

== Early life ==
Thompson, who was born in Chicago, grew up near the Cabrini–Green housing project and was a bright student who started the sixth grade at the age of 10. In seventh grade he began carrying a briefcase to school. Because of gang violence and crime that began to spread through the area in the late 1960s and 1970s, he was later moved by his grandmother to live with relatives in Indianapolis, where he attended North Central High School.

Thompson is a graduate of Purdue University, where he earned a Bachelor of Science degree in 1984 in electrical engineering. He also holds an honorary doctorate from Excelsior College. Thompson is a brother of the Alpha Phi Alpha fraternity.

== Career ==
Thompson is an electrical engineer by profession. He joined McDonald's in 1990 after working for a military aircraft manufacturer that is now part of Northrop Grumman. At McDonald's, Thompson designed robotic equipment for food transport and made control circuits for cooking. Thompson received a call from a McDonald's recruiter who was looking for an engineer to design "robotics, control circuitry and feedback loops". He eventually accepted an invitation to visit the McDonald's headquarters in suburban Chicago by an engineer working there. Soon after the visit he was hired and enrolled in the company's Black Career Development program, classes that McDonald's has held since the 1970s both to educate all employees about cultural differences and to help minorities navigate its corporate culture.

Having started his career at McDonald's in 1990, Thompson quickly rose on the corporate ladder. By 1992, he was promoted to Project Manager and Staff Director for the Quality Development department. He then switched over to Operations in 1994, spending his first six months learning the basics on how to manage a "McDonald's" restaurant by working at a South Chicago restaurant, moving up from fry cook to shift manager, then assistant manager and then co-manager.

Thompson later ran McDonald's corporate offices in Denver, the San Diego area, and the Midwest.

By January 2005, Thompson, now an Executive Vice President, began to serve as Chief Operations Officer (COO) of all US restaurants. On August 23, 2006, he became the President of McDonald's USA and McDonald's Restaurants of Canada. In 2007, Thompson stepped into the role of Chief Operating Officer for the global corporation, and on July 1, 2012, he became president and chief executive officer (CEO) of McDonald's Corp, succeeding outgoing CEO, the retiring Jim Skinner. However Thompson was not the first choice as successor, he was third, having won the position when executives Michael Roberts and Ralph Alvarez left McDonald's in 2006 and 2009, respectively.

Due to a 4.1 percent decline in customer traffic in 2014, Thompson announced that he was stepping down from his CEO position effective March 1, 2015.

In 2014, Thompson and his wife co-founded the nonprofit organization, The Cleveland Avenue Foundation for Education, and in 2015, the food and beverage venture capital firm, Cleveland Avenue LLC. Both of these names pay homage to the Chicago street where he and his wife grew up. One of their nonprofit organization's largest initiatives is called The 1954 Project, which launched in 2020, and seeks to give $100M to help Black educators.

In November 2015, it was announced that Thompson joined the board of directors of vegan meat alternative company Beyond Meat.

Thompson also serves on the board of directors of Ronald McDonald House Charities, Catalyst, and Northwestern Memorial Hospital. He is also a member of Purdue University's board of trustees.

Business positions
Preceded by Jim Skinner	CEO of McDonald's; 2012–2015	Succeeded by Steve Easterbrook
