= Cosmic background =

Cosmic background may refer to:

- Cosmic microwave background radiation (CMB)
- Cosmic neutrino background (CνB)
- Cosmic gravitational wave background (GWB)
- Cosmic infrared background (CIB)
- Cosmic background radiation
- Cosmic X-ray background
- Cosmic visible light background

== See also ==
- Cosmic (disambiguation)
- Background (disambiguation)
