= Backgrounding =

Way of feeding livestock before selling them

Backgrounding is an intermediate stage sometimes used in cattle production which begins after weaning and ends upon placement in a feedlot. Background feeding relies more heavily on forage (e.g., pasture, hay) in combination with grains to increase a calf's weight by several hundred pounds and to build up immunity to diseases before putting them in a feedlot in preparation for slaughter. Some cattle operations specialize in backgrounding.

== See also ==
- Cattle § Terminology
