= Foreground and background =

Foreground and background or background and foreground may refer to:

- Background, foreground, sideground and postground intellectual property, distinct forms of intellectual property assets
- Background subtraction, a technique in image processing and computer vision by which an image's foreground is extracted for further processing
- Figure–ground (perception), a humans' ability to separate foreground from background in visual images
- Foreground-background, a scheduling algorithm that is used to control execution of multiple processes on a single processor
- Foreground-background segmentation, a way of studying change blindness using photographs with distinct foreground and background scenery
- Foreground detection, a concept in computer vision to detect changes in image sequences
- Foreground and background in photography and cinematography, a principle important for
  - Depth of field, the distance between the nearest and furthest objects in a scene that appear acceptably sharp in an image
  - Deep focus, a technique using a large depth of field
  - Fill flash, to correctly expose the foreground and background objects
  - Photographic layering, a compositional technique
- Front projection effect, an in-camera visual effects process in film production for combining foreground performance with pre-filmed background footage
- Parallax scrolling, a scrolling technique in computer graphics, wherein background images move by the camera slower than foreground images, creating an illusion of depth
- Rear projection effect, an in-camera cinematic technique in film production for combining foreground performances with pre-filmed backgrounds
- Simple interactive object extraction, an algorithm used to extract foreground objects from color images and videos
- Structural level, an abstract representation of a piece of music.

== See also ==
- Background (disambiguation)
