= Chris Kempczinski =

Chief executive officer (CEO) of McDonald's since 2019

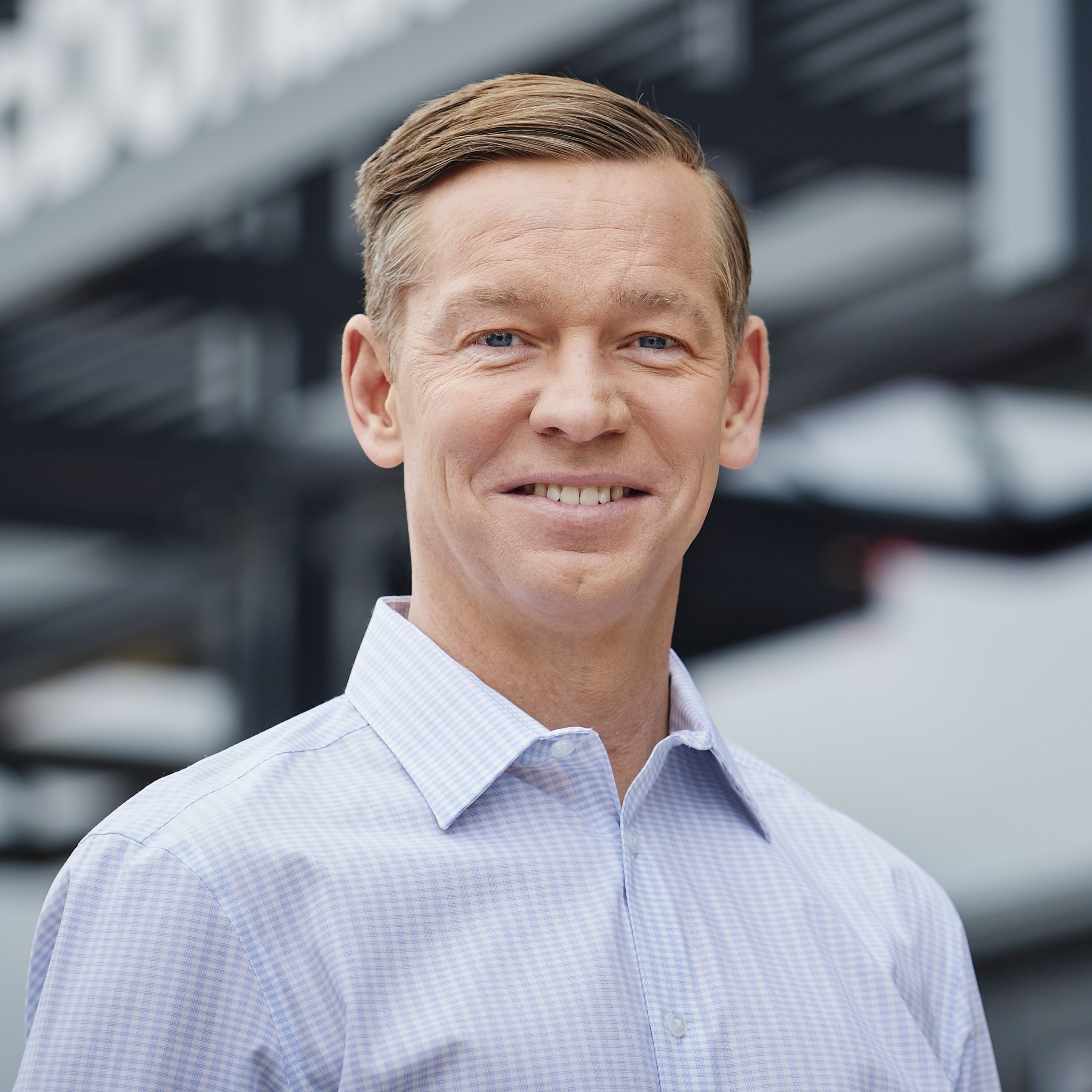
- Born: Christopher John Kempczinski; 1968 (age 57–58); Boston, Massachusetts, U.S.
- Education: Duke University (BA); Harvard University (MBA)
- Title: President, chairman and CEO, McDonald's
- Term: 2019–present
- Predecessor: Steve Easterbrook
- Spouse: Heather Kempczinski
- Children: 2

Christopher John Kempczinski (born 1968) is an American business executive, and the president, chairman, and chief executive officer (CEO) of McDonald's Corporation.

== Early life ==
Christopher John Kempczinski was born in Boston, Massachusetts, and raised in Cincinnati, Ohio. He is the son of Richard Kempczinski, who was a professor of surgery and Chief of Vascular Surgery at the University of Cincinnati Medical Center, and Ann Marie Kempczinski (née Campbell), who was a primary school teacher at Terrace Park Elementary in Cincinnati. He is of Polish descent. He graduated in 1987 from Indian Hill High School in suburban Cincinnati.

Kempczinski earned a bachelor's degree from Duke University in 1991, and an M.B.A. from Harvard Business School in 1997.

== Career ==
Kempczinski started his career with Procter & Gamble in brand management, and worked for four years in its soap sector division, before leaving to attend Harvard Business School (HBS). After HBS, he became a management consultant at the Boston Consulting Group, focusing on consumer products and pharmaceuticals.

In 2000, Kempczinski joined PepsiCo in its corporate strategy & development group, and in 2006, was named the vice president of marketing for the Non Carbonated Beverages Division of Pepsi-Cola North America Beverages.

Before joining McDonald's, Kempczinski worked for Kraft Foods as executive vice president of growth initiatives, and president of Kraft International. He left Kraft in September 2015.

In 2008, Kempczinski was inducted into the American Advertising Federation Hall of Achievement.

Kempczinski joined the McDonald's global strategy team in late 2015, and was promoted to president of McDonald's USA in October 2016 where he oversaw the business operations of approximately 14,000 restaurants. In November 2019, he succeeded Steve Easterbrook as president and CEO. Easterbrook was fired for violating company policy by having a relationship with an employee. Shortly after his promotion to CEO, Kempczinski moved to create a "more professional culture" among executives and other staff, focusing on human resources.

In November 2020, Kempczinski launched a new digital approach to sales mainly for drive thru, home delivery and pick up, known as "Accelerating the Arches." In 2023, McDonald's unveiled 'Accelerating the Arches 2.0,' focusing on delivery, drive-thru, and development.

In 2021, Kempczincki apologized to employees and the public for private remarks he made about the gun deaths of children at McDonald's. In correspondence with Mayor Lori Lightfoot of Chicago, he blamed parents of the victims: "With both, the parents failed those kids which I know is something you can't say. Even harder to fix." Publication of the exchange "sparked outrage." Chicago civic groups and the Service Employees International Union demanded Kempczinski apologize, saying "Your text message was ignorant, racist and unacceptable coming from anyone, let alone the CEO of McDonald's."

In response to the Russian invasion of Ukraine, Kempczinski decided to suspend sales and operations for all company-owned restaurants in Ukraine indefinitely, while continuing to compensate Ukrainian employees. Similar operational changes were initially implemented in Russia, until McDonald's announced a complete withdrawal of business in the country in May. In Russia, his plan impacted 853 restaurants and approximately 62,000 employees.

In a 2022 speech addressing the Economic Club of Chicago, Kempczinski expressed concerns about the impact of crime on business in the city and encouraged public–private partnerships to enhance safety.

As of March 2024, Kempczinski is also the chairman of McDonald's.

In 2026, Kempczinski announced their McDonald's NEXT strategy.

=== Big Arch burger video ===
In March 2026, Kempczinski faced criticism for his short video promoting the Big Arch burger. Audiences described the video as forced and corporate, with Kempczinski repeatedly referring to the burger as a "product". Social media users claimed he seemed unenthusiastic about eating the food. His video was widely mocked and parodied, including by the presidents of both Burger King Americas and Wendy's, as well as the spokesperson for A&W in Canada.

== Compensation ==
In 2021, Kempczinski's total compensation from McDonald's was $20 million. In 2023, Kempczinski's total compensation from McDonald's was $19.2 million.

== Recognition ==
Kempczinski received the Distinguished Alumni Award from the Indian Hill Foundation, and was named a person "shaping retail's future" by the NRF Foundation (the philanthropic branch of the National Retail Federation).

== Board seats and associations ==
- McDonald's Corp. Board of Directors, Chairman
- Procter & Gamble Board of Directors
- Ronald McDonald House Charities Trustee
- The Business Council, Member

== Personal life ==
Kempczinski is married with two children. He has run marathons, and as of 2020 was running at least 50 miles (80 km) a week.

Business positions
Preceded by Steve Easterbrook	CEO of McDonald's; 2019–present	Incumbent
