= McDonaldland =

Fast food-themed media franchise

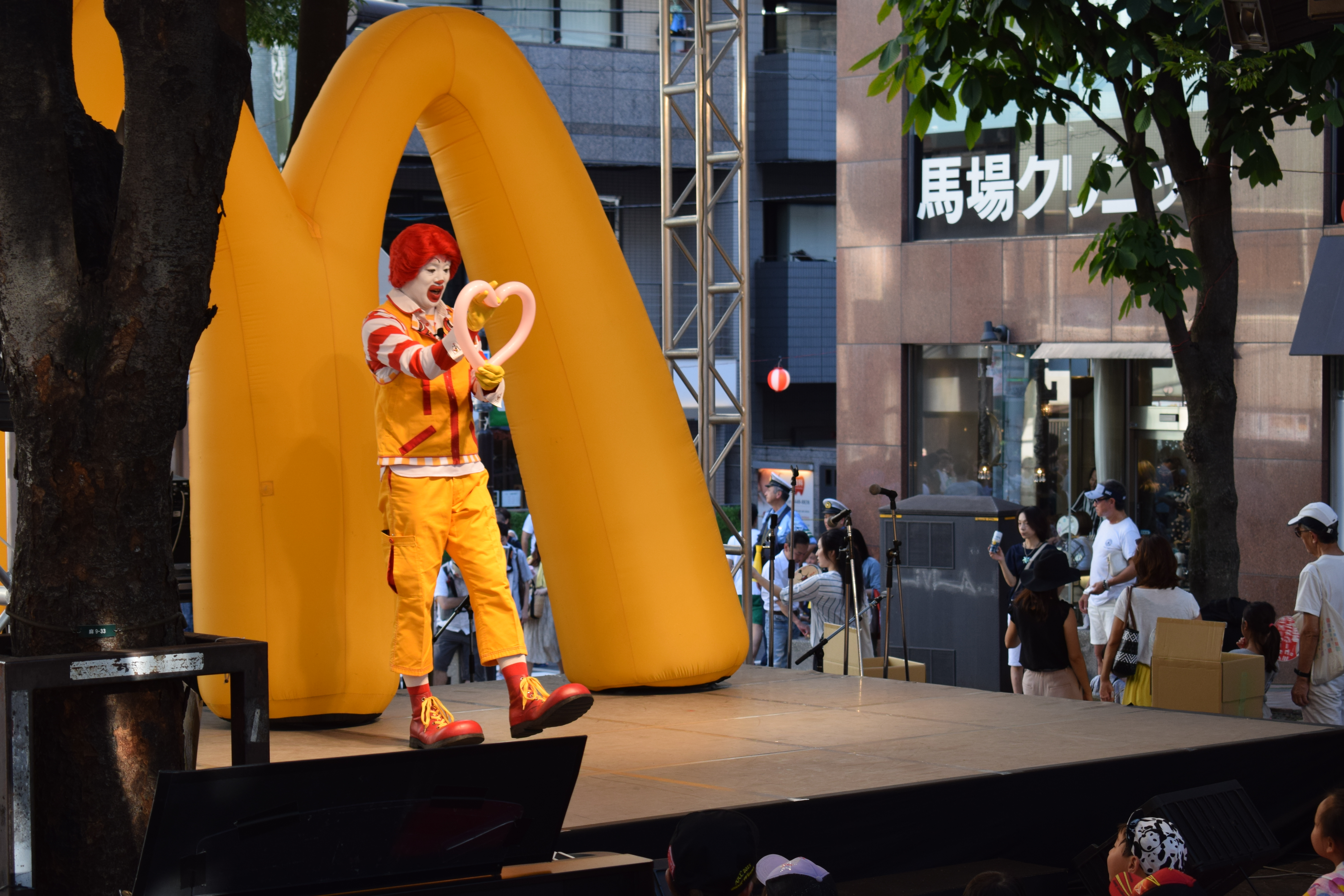
- An actor portraying Ronald McDonald at a Japanese festival in Azabu-Jūban
- Original work: Ronald McDonald (1963)
- Owner: McDonald's
- Years: 1963–present

Print publications
- Books: Little Golden Books Ronald McDonald and the Tale of the Talking Plant (1984); Discover the Rainforest by Mike Roberts and Russell Mittermeier, Gad Meiron, and Randall Stone, and illustrated by Donna Reynolds and Tim Racer (1991)
- Comics: Charlton Comics Ronald McDonald series (1970)

Films and television
- Film: Mac and Me (1988)
- Short films: Ronald McDonald and the Adventure Machine (1987)
- Animated series: The Wacky Adventures of Ronald McDonald (1998–2003)
- Direct-to-video: The Adventures of Ronald McDonald: McTreasure Island (1990)

Games
- Video games: Donald Land (1988); M.C. Kids (1992); Global Gladiators (1992); McDonald's Treasure Land Adventure (1993)

Miscellaneous
- Toys: Happy Meal toys; McKids clothing line
- Theme park attractions: McDonald's PlayPlace (1971–present); World's Largest Entertainment McDonald's (1976–present)
- Nonprofit charity: Ronald McDonald House Charities (1974)

McDonaldland is a McDonald's media franchise and the fictional fantasy world inhabited by Ronald McDonald and his friends. Starting with the creation of Ronald McDonald in 1963, it is primarily developed and published by McDonald's. Initial attempts to expand the McDonaldland universe by marketing agency Needham, Harper & Steers were seemingly retconned due to legal issues, but ongoing aspects were expanded in McDonald's projects in collaboration with Data East, Virgin Interactive, Treasure, SEGA, and Klasky Csupo.

The series centers on an adventuring magical clown named Ronald McDonald, who has red hair, white and red face paint, and wears a yellow jumpsuit over a red and white striped long-sleeve shirt with yellow gloves. His most regularly occurring friends are Grimace, the Hamburglar, Birdie the Early Bird, the Fry Kids, the McNugget Buddies, and the Happy Meal Gang. The fictional world has a variety of inspirations from general high fantasy and low fantasy, to corporate culture and corporate personality, to more specific influences including the artwork of Koichi Kimura from McDonald's Treasure Land Adventure.

In addition to being used in advertising, the characters were used as the basis for themed equipment in the "PlayPlaces" attached to some McDonald's outlets, small recreational activity rooms intended for young children. While the McDonaldland portion has received somewhat less attention since 2003, several of the characters including Ronald McDonald, Grimace, Birdie the Early Bird, and the Hamburglar are still seen in commercials, Happy Meal toys, and materials supporting the Ronald McDonald House Charities. The characters received entire dedicated McDonaldland themed line-ups of Funko Pop! figures in 2019 and onward, including Ronald, Grimace, the Hamburglar, the Fry Kids and McNugget Buddies, Birdie the Early Bird, Mayor McCheese and Officer Big Mac.

== Overview ==
=== Setting ===
McDonaldland takes place predominantly in its own high fantasy world, though parts of the McDonaldland world have low fantasy interactions with the real world. In earlier commercials, McDonaldland had sentient trees that grew apple pies, a hamburger patch, a French Fry patch, a shake volcano, Filet-O-Fish Lake, and the one-shot Sundae Mountain.

In The Wacky Adventures of Ronald McDonald the denizens of McDonaldland were shown to be able to travel between worlds using PlayPlace slides. Ronald is an adventurer with magical powers that acts as an ambassador for good and freedom, such as traveling to the rain forest to bring attention to endangered species and deforestation or delivering a safety PSA on the importance of seat belts.

Redemption arcs are incorporated within McDonaldland media. Grimace, a purple monster, was originally an antagonist that stole beverages and shakes from customers, but has since become a good guy. The Hamburglar, also originally a villain, was a thief that targeted hamburgers and sandwiches, but he is now more of a lovable rogue character.

=== Locations ===
The most often occurring regions, as seen in numerous McDonaldland commercials and video games are a forest, town, sea, and outer space. Their exact geographic layout is unknown, but within these regions are several locales including Grimace Island, a Western-themed area, several portals to real world McDonald's restaurants, the Moon, and Ronald's home.

== History ==
The namesake for McDonaldLand is the McDonald's restaurants founded by Richard and Maurice McDonald and popularized by Ray Kroc. Ronald McDonald was originally portrayed by Willard Scott, a former Bozo the Clown actor. In 1963, he and Washington, D.C. franchisee Oscar Goldstein created the initial aspects of the character. The idea to expand the McDonaldland universe was outsourced to Needham, Harper & Steers in 1970–71 at the request of McDonald's for its restaurants. The first commercial aired in January 1971. The early commercials were built on an upbeat, bubblegum-style tune and feature a narrator; many have plots that involve various villains, like the Hamburglar, Evil Grimace, and Captain Crook trying to steal a corresponding food item but being foiled by Ronald.

In 1973, Sid and Marty Krofft sued McDonald's, claiming that the entire McDonaldland premise plagiarized their television show H. R. Pufnstuf. In Sid & Marty Krofft Television Productions Inc. v. McDonald's Corp., the Kroffts also claimed that the character Mayor McCheese was an infringement on their copyrighted character H. R. Pufnstuf (also a mayor); Pufnstuf's voice actor, Lennie Weinrib, was even involved with the McDonaldland ads, as the voice of Grimace. At trial, a jury found in favor of the Kroffts, and McDonald's was ordered to pay $50,000. The case was appealed by both parties to the United States Court of Appeals for the Ninth Circuit. In 1977, the appeals court reassessed damages in favor of the Kroffts to more than $1,000,000. McDonald's was ordered to stop producing some of the characters or modify them to be legally distinct, and to stop airing commercials featuring those characters until then.

In 1976, Remco created a line of six-inch (15 cm) action figures to celebrate the characters.

In the 1980s and 1990s, the McDonaldland commercials remained a popular marketing device. The characters that remained after the lawsuit were Ronald McDonald, Grimace, Hamburglar, and the French Fry Gobblins (renamed the Fry Guys and later the Fry Kids with the addition of the Fry Girls). Mayor McCheese, Officer Big Mac, Captain Crook and the Professor were used until 1985. (They did return for a Sears advertisement in 1987.) In the early 1980s Birdie the Early Bird joined the lineup, representing the restaurant's new breakfast line. Some of the characters' physical appearances were revised in later commercials (notably Hamburglar, Grimace, and Birdie). From then on the characters lived in reality and interacted with real people, but commercials still took place in McDonaldland. Soon, the Happy Meal Gang and the McNugget Buddies became prominent features in the commercials (representing the restaurant's Happy Meals and Chicken McNuggets, respectively—the menu items that mainly appealed to kids) along with Ronald.

Merchandise featuring the McDonaldland characters included "McDonaldland Fun Times", a kid-friendly magazine published six times a year. A direct-to-video animated film, The Adventures of Ronald McDonald: McDonaldland Treasure Island, was released in 1989, featuring much of the McDonaldland characters from the 1980s. Video games featuring the characters were also released, such as M.C. Kids and McDonald's Treasure Land Adventure.

From 1998 until 2003, Rugrats creators Klasky Csupo and McDonald's released an animated direct-to-video series exclusively on VHS titled The Wacky Adventures of Ronald McDonald. The series depicted Ronald, Grimace, Birdie, the Hamburglar, and a few new characters, like Ronald's pessimistic dog Sundae. These videos began in live action in what resembled a futuristic McDonaldland. Whenever the characters went down a tube or otherwise traveled, they became animated. In all six episodes, Ronald goes on adventures with his friends and they learn new things along the way.

In the early 2000s, McDonald's experimented with the animating the characters to improve ratings. Various spots featuring the Hamburglar and other characters alongside celebrities were planned but canceled. A conflict emerged between agencies over whether to continue using the characters or heed the desire of ad agency Leo Burnett by elevating the "I'm lovin' it" campaign. The McDonaldland premise was largely dropped from campaigns and Happy Meal toys. Still, the characters continued to appear in advertising and McDonald's PlayPlaces, decorative seats for children's birthday parties, and bibs, though only Ronald McDonald, Birdie, Grimace, the Hamburglar, and the Fry Kids appear in them. They also appeared on some soft drink cups until 2008 and still appear as cookies in pouches titled "McDonaldland Cookies".

McDonald's CEO Jim Skinner defended Ronald McDonald, saying he is "here to stay". Today, the characters still appear on the windows of some McDonald's restaurants. Modern commercials depict Ronald McDonald alone in real-world situations with children, visiting a local McDonald's restaurant or sick children at a Ronald McDonald House. The other characters still appear: during the 2010s, the Happy Meal box character from the original 1979 Happy Meal Gang was redesigned to be a main character for Happy Meals; a parody hipster version of the Hamburglar was portrayed by Max Greenfield; and Grimace had a non-speaking appearance in an advertisement for Monsters vs. Aliens Happy Meal toys and, animated and voiced by Ryan Reynolds, made a cameo in a 2022 Super Bowl LVI commercial with Kanye West.

Funko designed several ongoing Pop! Vinyl! figures starting in 2019 representing McDonaldland characters, including a line dedicated to The McNugget Buddies and some characters thought to be retconned, like Mayor McCheese and Officer Big Mac.

On August 5, 2025, the McDonaldland franchise and most of its characters, including Ronald McDonald, were brought back in a commercial to promote a new meal after nearly two decades, officially launching on August 12. McDonald's created a website to promote the franchise.

== Characters ==
=== Ronald McDonald ===
Ronald McDonald is the primary cultural icon and official mascot of McDonald's. He is a clown with red hair and a big red smile who wears a yellow jumpsuit and red shoes.

=== Hamburglar ===
The Hamburglar (performed by Frank Delfino from 1971–1992, Jerry Maren in some commercials, Tommy Vicini from 1992–2003, voiced by Larry Storch from 1971–1986, Charlie Adler in "The Hamburglar Touch" commercial and in The Wacky Adventures of Ronald McDonald, Howard Morris from 1986–2003, and Carl W. Wolfe in some commercials during the 1990s) – A pint-sized burglar who was introduced in 1971 as one of the first antagonists of the commercials where he often attempts to steal hamburgers and cheeseburgers from Ronald. He was often referred to in his first commercial appearances as "the crafty old Hamburglar" and at least one ad promoting McDonald's breakfast menu as "The Lone Jogger", wearing a white T-shirt displaying that name on the front. Originally, the Hamburglar spoke in a gibberish language of "robble robble" which had to be translated by Captain Crook. He was reintroduced in 1985 as one of the main protagonists, with a radically friendlier appearance, where he spoke in normal sentences (but still peppered with "robble"), but retained his penchant for trying to steal burgers. In 2015, McDonald's brought back the Hamburglar as part of the promotion of a new sirloin burger.

=== Grimace ===
Grimace (performed by Patty Saunders from 1971–1983, Mauri Bernstein in some 1980s commercials, Terry Castillo-Faass from 1983–2000, voiced by Lennie Weinrib from 1971–1986, Frank Welker and sometimes Larry Moran from 1986–2003, Kevin Michael Richardson in The Wacky Adventures of Ronald McDonald) – A large purple monster who was introduced in November 1971 as the "Evil Grimace". In Grimace's first appearances, he was one of the original main antagonists and was depicted with two pairs of arms which were used to steal milkshakes and Cokes. "Evil" was soon dropped from Grimace's name and he was reintroduced in 1972 as a protagonist where he only has one set of arms. He was then a rather clumsy, but still amiable monster from then on. His exact nature has been disputed: in a 2010 interview, a McDonald's spokesperson said that Grimace was a taste bud. A 2014 Tweet from the McDonald's Twitter account stated "Grimace lore says he is the embodiment of a milkshake or a taste bud." In 2021, Brian Bates, a franchisee in Canada, stated in an interview widely reported on in the press that Grimace is an anthropomorphic taste bud. Writing in The Takeout, Lillian Stone disputed this, pointing out other material that established that Grimace was part of a species of Grimaces, including his Uncle O'Grimacey who promoted the Shamrock Shake. To celebrate the 51 year anniversary of the character's inception, in 2023, McDonalds ran a promotion to celebrate Grimace's birthday with the release of the Grimace Shake, which became an Internet meme on social media platforms. On June 12, 2024, Grimace threw the ceremonial first pitch at a New York Mets game, who were struggling at the time. After his appearance, the Mets went on a seven game winning streak and Grimace was embraced by the team's fans. In September 2024, the Mets unveiled a purple seat at Citi Field, their home ballpark, to honor Grimace's connection with the team and its fans. Grimace rode a 7 subway train branded with imagery featuring the character to Citi Field just before Game 3 of the 2024 National League Division Series between the Mets and the Philadelphia Phillies.

=== Fry Kids ===
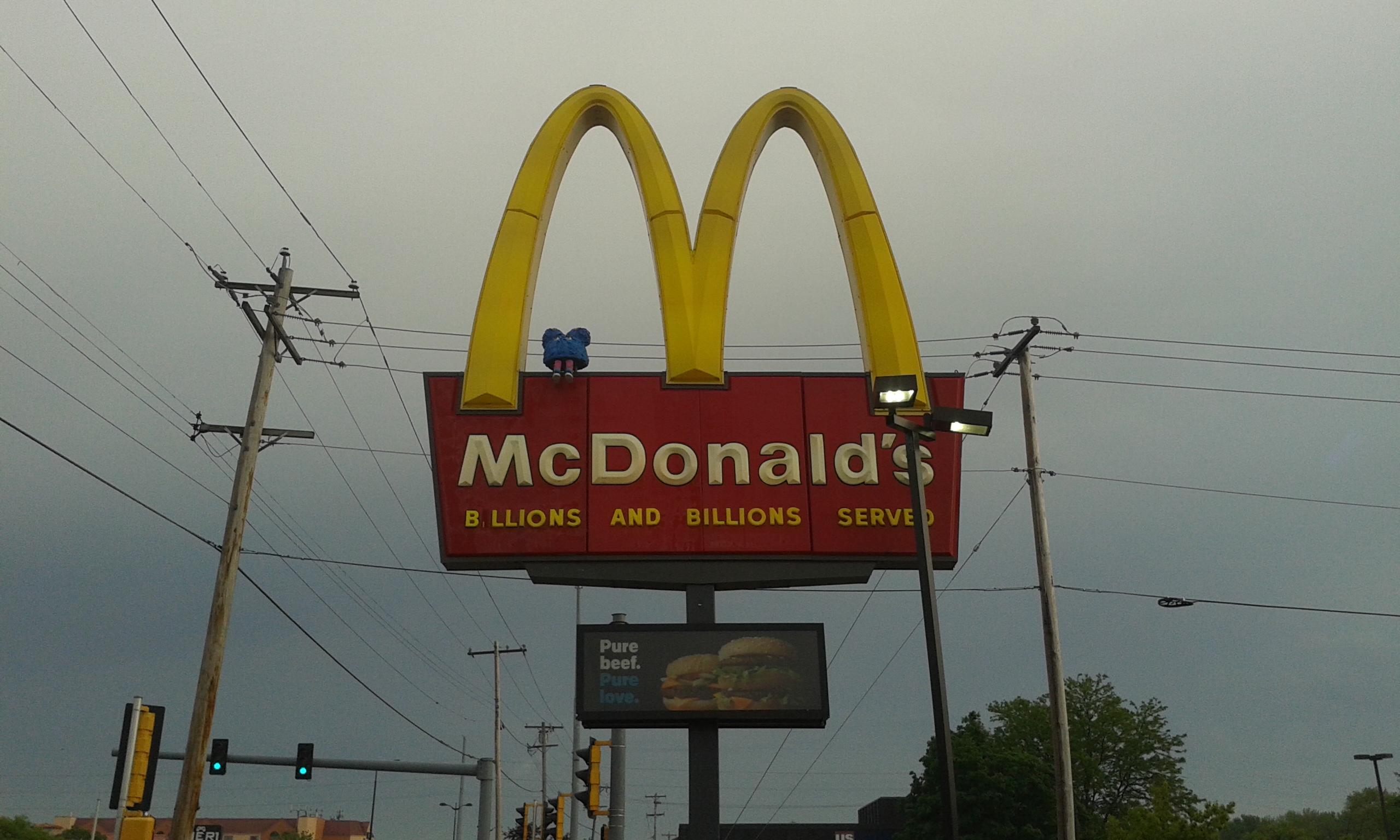
A blue Fry Kid is seen sitting on a McDonald's sign in Greenfield, Wisconsin.

Introduced in 1972 as "Gobblins", the Fry Kids (various voices in the commercials, Kath Soucie, Paul Greenberg and Nika Futterman in The Wacky Adventures of Ronald McDonald) are small, shaggy, ball-like creatures with legs and no arms who try to steal other characters' French fries; they include both male Fry Guys and female Fry Girls.

On the McDonaldland website, they were called the "Fry Friends".

=== Birdie the Early Bird ===
Birdie the Early Bird (performed by Felix Silla 1979–1986, Patty Maloney 1986–2001, voiced by Russi Taylor in the commercials, Christine Cavanaugh in The Wacky Adventures of Ronald McDonald, Megan Harvey, 2022-present) – A yellow bird wearing a pink jumpsuit, flight cap and scarf who was introduced in 1980 as the first female character. Made to promote the company's new breakfast items, she is depicted as a poor flyer and a somewhat clumsy person in general.

=== Uncle O'Grimacy ===
Uncle O'Grimacey (performed by Robert Towers, voiced by Lennie Weinrib) was introduced in 1977 for an advertising narrative of McDonald's both in celebration of Saint Patrick's Day and to mark the annual appearance of the Shamrock Shake, he is depicted as Grimace's uncle.

=== The Happy Meal Gang ===
The Happy Meal Gang were introduced in 1979. They were joined by the McNugget Buddies in 1984 and the Happy Meal Box and the Under 3 Toy in 1992. The Happy Meal Gang consist of The Happy Meal Hamburger (voiced by Bob Arbogast and later voiced by Jim Cummings), the Happy Meal Fries (voiced by Jeff Winkless and later voiced by Bob Bergen and then Tress MacNeille) and the Happy Meal Drink (voiced by Hal Smith and later voiced by Bill Farmer). The Happy Meal Box character was never voiced, but became a standalone part of marketing campaign for Happy Meals during the 2010s.

On the McDonaldland website, the Happy Meal Gang were referred to as the "Food Buddies".

=== The McNugget Buddies ===
The McNugget Buddies (variously voiced by Greg Berg, Pat Fraley, Katie Leigh, Pat Musick, Don Messick, Hal Rayle, and Frank Welker in the commercials, Pamela Adlon, Lisa Raggio and Charlie Adler in The Wacky Adventures of Ronald McDonald) – A bunch of anthropomorphic regular-sized Chicken McNuggets who were introduced in 1984.

=== CosMc ===
CosMc (performed by Tommy Vicini, voiced by Frank Welker) is an alien who appeared in commercials during the mid-1980s. CosMc was a character in the video game M.C. Kids. The character occasionally came to steal food for his planet, CosMcland. It also spoke in a mixture of robot-esque sounds and normal speech. The character was used as an inspiration for the spin-off restaurant CosMc's.

=== Bernie ===
Bernice (performed by Tim Blaney and Tony Urbano) is a strange creature that was introduced in 1992 and that ate inedible things like the script in the three-part "Ronald McDonald Makin' Movies" commercial.

=== Vulture ===
An unnamed vulture who spoke in a monotone voice.

=== Sundae ===
Sundae (performed by Verne Troyer, voiced by Dee Bradley Baker) – Ronald's dog who has appeared only in The Wacky Adventures of Ronald McDonald where he was animated with puppetry. The animatronic Sundae was created by Optic Nerve Studios, Inc. Troyer was assisted in performing Sundae by puppeteers Mark Garbarino, Bryan Blair, Russell Shinkle and Shaun Smith. One commercial involving Ronald using the McDonald's sign as a pogo stick depicted Sundae as an actual dog.

=== Iam Hungry ===
Iam Hungry (voiced by Jeff Lupetin) is a short-lived McDonaldland character who was introduced in 1998 and was dropped in 2001. Self-proclaimed as the "Vice President of Snacking", the character is a floating, fast-moving green fuzzball with orange arms and a monstrous face who has a big appetite.

=== Mike the Microphone ===
Mike the Microphone is a one-time character created especially for the Kid Rhino albums Ronald Makes It Magic and Ronald McDonald Presents Silly Sing Along. Voiced by Larry Moran.

=== Former characters ===
These characters have not appeared since the 1980s, and the reason remains unknown. Though many assume it had something to do with the lawsuit, this might be incorrect as Mayor McCheese and Officer Big Mac both appear in the 2020 Funko McDonaldland Pop! Vinyl! figures.

==== Mayor McCheese ====
Mayor McCheese (performed by Billy Curtis from 1971–1979, Jerry Maren from 1980–1985, voiced by Howard Morris impersonating Ed Wynn in the commercials, Bob Joles impersonating Wynn in The Wacky Adventures of Ronald McDonald) is an enormous cheeseburger-headed character who first appeared in 1971 and was removed in 1985. He sported a top hat, a diplomat's sash and a pair of pince-nez spectacles and was portrayed as McDonaldland's bumbling and incompetent mayor. He was the subject of a lawsuit filed by Sid and Marty Krofft for similarities to H.R. Pufnstuf; specifically, both were characters with enormous heads who served as the elected leader of a fantastical setting.

==== Officer Big Mac ====
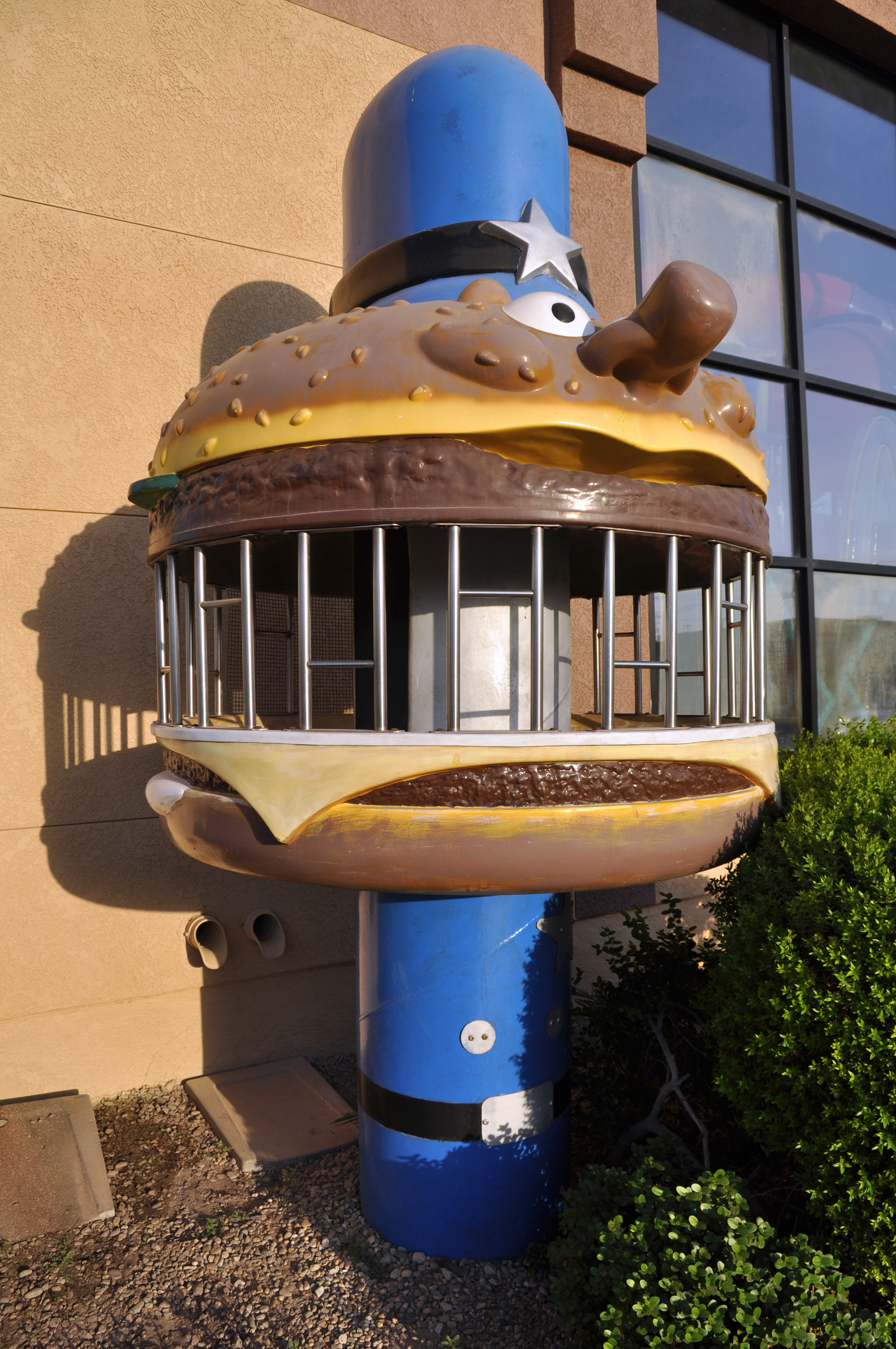
Officer Big Mac climb-in jail playground

Officer Big Mac (performed by Jerry Maren, voiced by Ted Cassidy) – Introduced in 1971 and dropped in 1985, he is similar to Mayor McCheese in appearance in that he has a large burger for a head. In his case, his head is a Big Mac (minus the vegetables and special sauce) rather than a cheeseburger. Officer Big Mac is the chief of police and as such he wears a constable's uniform with a disproportionately small custodian helmet resting atop his head bun. As the main source of law and order in McDonaldland, Officer Big Mac spends most of his time chasing Hamburglar and Captain Crook.

==== Captain Crook ====
Captain Crook (performed by Robert Towers, voiced by Larry Storch in 1971–1983, Tim Blaney in 1984–1985) – A pirate captain who was introduced in 1971 as one of the main antagonists and dropped in 1985. Captain Crook steals Filet-O-Fish sandwiches and often interprets Hamburglar's gibberish. He was revised in 1984 with a Muppet-like appearance and later became simply known as "The Captain" where he has a parrot and operates the S.S. Filet-O-Fish.

On the McDolandland website, Captain Crook was referred to as "The Captain".

==== The Professor ====
The Professor (portrayed by Lou Wagner, voiced by John Stephenson in the 1970s, Andre Stojka in the 1980s) – A scientist who is McDonaldland's inventor and researcher. He was introduced in 1971 and has invented different devices throughout McDonaldland such as the Psychedelic Electronic Hamburger Machine (which made only pumpkins for some reason), the Dinner Gong, an invisible car that helped Ronald McDonald get to McDonald's to meet with the kids, a magnetic bat, and the Chicken McNugget Dip-O-Matic. In his first appearances, he was a bespectacled man with a beard, neck-length hair, and a hat. In the 80s, he was a bespectacled man with a moustache, a long nose, and a helmet with a lightbulb on it. The character was dropped in 1985.

=== New characters ===
Some McDonaldland characters were introduced in 2009 and the McDonaldland Resurgence in August 12, 2025.

==== Happy ====
Happy is an anthropomorphic Happy Meal box introduced in 2009. His features include his boxy red body, a wide smile, human-like teeth and eyes, and flexible slender arms and legs. He has been shown to live in "Happy City", along with others who look like him. During promotional campaigns, he has interacted with popular characters such as the Minions and Super Mario, among others.

==== Aunt Millie and Aunt Tillie ====
Aunt Millie and Aunt Tillie were introduced in the McDonaldland Resurgence as the doting aunts of Grimace. They are depicted as McDonaldland's favorite visitors.

== In other media ==
- Ronald McDonald appears during a child's birthday party at a McDonald's in one scene of the 1988 film Mac & Me. He is portrayed by Squire Fridell, who played Ronald in commercials during the latter half of the 1980s.
- Mayor McCheese makes appearances in three episodes of the Fox animated television series Family Guy: "Believe It or Not, Joe's Walking on Air", "Road to the Multiverse" and "Valentine's Day in Quahog". In all three episodes, he is voiced by John Viener.
- Clerks: The Animated Series featured the fictional mayor and chief of police of Leonardo, New Jersey wearing costumes based on Mayor McCheese and Office Big Mac, respectively (both had been going to costume parties when the episode's plot, a deadly virus supposedly being released into Leonardo, occurred, and in the case of the mayor he was unable to remove his costume when the zipper got stuck). Steve-Dave and Walt asked "Big Mac" if "this administration will ever bring the Hamburglar to justice", while a reporter inquires as to whether or not Grimace is immune to the virus ("Nothing can kill the Grimace"). "Mayor McCheese" was voiced by Al Franken while "Officer Big Mac" is voiced by Mike McShane. On the DVD commentary, Kevin Smith indicated that had the show gone past 6 episodes, "Mayor McCheese" would've been kept as a recurring character (with him always in his costume, always being on his way to or from a costume party).
- In Carlton Mellick III's Bizarro fiction books Warrior Wolf Women of the Wasteland and its sequel Barbarian Beast Bitches of the Badlands, set in a post-apocalyptic world, McDonaldland is the last remaining city-state, governed by fascist The Blessed McDonald's Corporation and completely themed around McDonald's (e.g., all buildings are red and yellow). Every day, its inhabitants pray five times, work two shifts, and eat three meals of its fast-food – which, due to containing abundant chemicals, mutates men into eventually growing extra limbs (who upon discovery are seized by Fry Guys police officers) and women into becoming increasingly wolf-like each time they have sex (and then being banished into the outer Wastelands to fight for their own survival); any other food or beverage is outlawed. Once cherished McDonaldland characters such as Mayor McCheese and the Hamburglar are reimagined in horrifically twisted versions.

== See also ==
- Mac Tonight
- Burger King Kingdom – Burger King's answer to McDonaldland.
- Fast food advertising
