= Nicolai Poliakoff =

Russian, Soviet, and British clown (1900–1974)

Nicolai Poliakoff OBE
- Poliakoff reading his fan mail
- Born: Russian: Никола́й Петрóвич Полякóв; 2 October 1900; Dvinsk, Russian Empire
- Died: 25 September 1974 (aged 73); Peterborough, England
- Citizenship: Russian Empire → Soviet Union → United Kingdom
- Known for: Coco the Clown
- Spouse: Valentina Novikova
- Children: Helen; Michael; Nadia; Sascha; Olga; Antonia
- Awards: Officer of the Order of the British Empire

Nicolai Poliakoff OBE (Latvian: Nikolajs Poļakovs, Russian: Николай Петрович Поляков, romanized: Nikolay Petrovich Polyakov; 2 October 1900 – 25 September 1974) was the creator of Coco the Clown, arguably the most famous clown in the United Kingdom in the mid-20th century.

== Biography ==
Poliakoff in costume

Nicolai Poliakoff was born in 1900 to a Jewish family in Dvinsk (today Daugavpils), Latvia which was then part of the Russian Empire. His family were poor and worked at the local theatre to supplement the money his father earned as a cobbler. When his father was conscripted to the army in the Russo-Japanese War the five year-old Nicolai started singing for food to avoid starvation.

- 1908—Nicolai “ran away and joined the circus,” as the saying goes. He travelled 300 miles by train to Vitebsk, in Belorussia (today Belarus), where he persuaded a circus owner to give him a job, telling him that he was an orphan with no one to look after him. The director bought his story and placed him under the charge of Vitaly Lazarenko, a clown and acrobat who would become a major circus star in the Soviet Union after the Communist revolution.
- Nicolai eventually persuaded his father to allow him to follow a circus career, and he was apprenticed for four years to Rudolfo Truzzi (1860–1936)—son of Massimiliano Truzzi, the founder of the great Russian circus dynasty of Italian descent. With Truzzi, Nicholai studied the fundamentals of acrobatics, trapeze, horse riding, and an array of circus disciplines. Russians are particularly fond of nicknames, and Nicolai was called Kokishka by Truzzi, a diminutive of “koshka” (cat in Russian), which in time became abbreviated to Koko—and rendered as Coco when Nicolai arrived in the United Kingdom.
- In 1915 Nicolai Polakovs was enlisted in the Imperial Army. During the ensuing Civil War, he was conscripted by the Red Army, escaped—only to be conscripted again by the White Army and escape again, disguised as a girl in a troupe of Mongolian travelling entertainers. Finally, when the political situation began to settle down, he returned to work in the circus.
- 1919— Nicolai was performing in Riga, when he met Valentina Novikova (1901–1983), whom he married in June of that year, and with whom he would have six children: Helen, Michael (1923–2009), Nadia, Sascha, Olga, and Antonia.
- 1920— He worked for the newly created (in 1919) Soviet state circus organisation, and travelled in the Soviet Union from one circus building to another.
- 1926— He had his own circus collective, a small but lively troupe of twenty based in Lithuania.
- 1929— Nicolai performed at Circus Busch (Before World War II, Soviet performers were still allowed to work in Western Europe.) in Berlin (and took the time to do a cameo in Karl Grune’s film version of Carl Zuckmayer’s play, Katharina Knie). He served with the Auxiliary Military Pioneer Corps of the British Army in World War II. He appeared with the Bertram Mills Circus for many years. His clown persona had two distinctive visual features that endeared him to television audiences: his boots, described as being size 58, and his trick hair with hinges in the centre parting, which allowed it to lift when he was surprised. He is a member of the Clown Hall of Fame.
- 21 December 1929 to 18 January 1930—Nicolai first appeared for Bertram Mills in Manchester.
- 1933–34—Coco’s contract with Mills was extended, and following the Olympia Christmas season.
- During the Second World War, Nicolai entertained troops as a member of ENSA (Entertainments National Service Association).
- In 1942 Coco and Michael were engaged at the Blackpool Tower Circus, for the Easter and summer programmes.
- 1946— Bertram Mills Circus reopened and Coco returned. He appeared on tour for every summer season until the closure of the touring show in October 1964.
- 1947–48 & 1966–67—He performed with Mills at the Olympia in London(Christmas show)
- 21 October 1949—Nicolai and Valentina eventually became naturalised British citizens.
- April 1957— During a performance at Chelmsford, Nicolai was knocked over and injured by a vehicle driven by Kam, "the only motoring elephant in the world"—one of Mills’s four elephants trained by Joan and Gösta Kruse.
- 1959— He was involved in a serious road accident prompting him to devote himself to the promotion of road safety awareness in children. However, at the same time he continued to work in the circus in the mid-1960s, seated ringside while selling programmes dressed in his full auguste's costume.

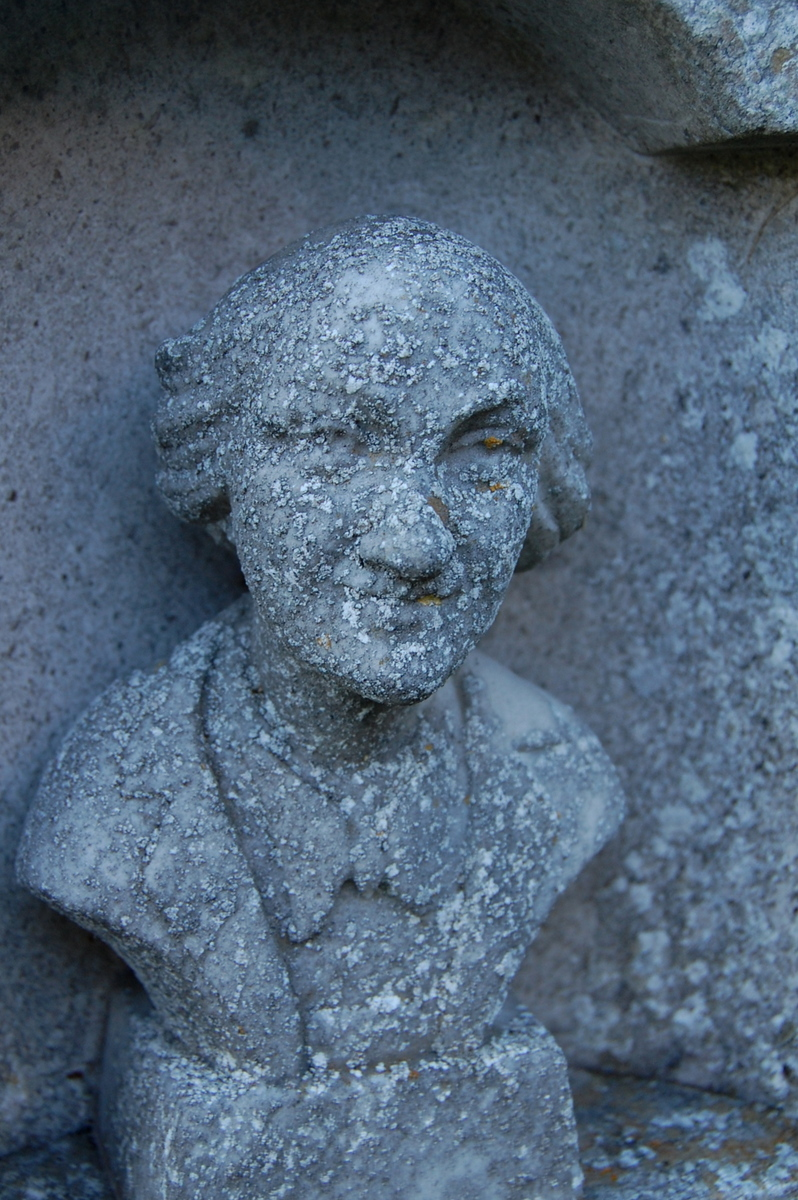
Stone carving of Coco the clown on his gravestone at Woodnewton.

- 1962— he was the subject of This Is Your Life when he was surprised by Eamonn Andrews at Olympia.
- 1963- He was interviewed by Roy Plomley on Desert Island Discs.
- 1973—He returned briefly to the circus world, when he toured with the Roberts Brothers Circus.
- 25 September 1974—Poliakoff died in Peterborough Hospital after a short illness, and was buried in the churchyard of St Mary's Woodnewton, in Northamptonshire, England.
- 29 November 1974. Memorial service held in St. Paul’s, London.

=== Culture ===
Coco is an Auguste, the foolish character who is always on the receiving end of buckets of water and custard pies. The Auguste often works with the more clever white-faced clown, who always gets the better of him.

=== Honours ===
Poliakoff was appointed an honorary member of the Association of Jewish Ex-Servicemen and Women. In 1963 he was appointed an Officer of the Most Excellent Order of the British Empire (OBE) for this work by Queen Elizabeth II.

=== Legacy ===
His eldest son, Michael, a longtime circus "Producing Clown", creator of a much imitated "soap gag" entree, and the Clown who designed the post 1960's Ronald McDonald, was by then already using the "Coco" moniker. Michael had made his debut in the ring at 17, as "Coconut" and his sister Helen as "Cocotina" ('cocos' being the Spanish word for grinning face and applied to the coconut because of the three marks on its shell). Michael's Coco the Clown was inducted into the International Clown Hall of Fame in 1991.

As well as Michael, Poliakoff had five other children with wife Valentina: Helen, Nadia, Sascha, Olga, and Tamara. Tamara was the founder, along with her husband Ali Hassani, of the first circus in the United Kingdom not to use performing animals.

== Books ==
- Nicolai Poliakoff, Coco the Clown, by himself (London, J.M. Dent & Sons Ltd, 1941)
- Nicolai Poliakoff, Behind My Greasepaint (London, Hutchinson & Co., 1950)
- David Jamieson, Bertram Mills, The Circus That Travelled By Train (Buntingford, Aardvark Publishing, 1998) — ISBN 1-872904-11-4
