= Donald Land =

1988 video game

- Developer: Data East
- Publisher: Data East
- Director: Hiromichi Nakamoto
- Producer: Tokinori Kaneyasu
- Designer: Seiichi Ishii
- Composers: Shogo Sakai; Shinichi Kamizono; Takafumi Miura
- Platform: Family Computer
- Release: JP: January 29, 1988
- Genre: Platform
- Mode: Single-player

Donald Land (ドナルドランド) is a 1988 platform video game produced by Data East in association with the McDonald's Corporation for the Family Computer, based on the McDonaldland franchise.

== Gameplay ==
Ronald McDonald is seen flying through the sky using a balloon while trying to avoid an oncoming enemy.

Unlike the commonly compared M.C. Kids, Donald Land is simply a platformer without any puzzle elements to it. The game centers on Ronald McDonald (often known in Japan as Donald McDonald). Most of Ronald's companions have been kidnapped and all the animals have turned feral. His brainwashed companions will occasionally attack. Ronald can defend himself using apple bombs, thrown in a carefully calculated parabola. Being hit by an enemy causes damage, which decreases Ronald's "Life" meter. During various parts of a stage, players have the opportunity to collect up to 100 hamburger icons throughout the game. This will result in gaining a bonus life along with the hamburger counter resetting itself to zero. It is also possible to play a mini-game challenge, to earn commodities that the player orders from McDonald's. as he attempts to bring peace to McDonaldland by making the player control the famous fast food clown.

Ronald can replenish his life bar by finding heart icons that are scattered throughout the level; the maximum number of hits that he can withstand before dying is five. From the second stage onward, the levels become more demanding with emphasis on making jumps from platform to platform while avoid bottomless pits. Items also become more difficult to reach and falling into a pit results in instantly losing a life. An enemy appears in the second level that resembles Little Red Riding Hood, although she causes damage like a normal enemy and cannot be destroyed by the player's apple bombs. A few of the bosses look like unusual for the game's target demographic. The third boss looks like a giant mechanical dragon, while the boss of level 5 is a bone dragon and players encounter a disembodied head at the end of the eleventh level.

== Characters ==
- Ronald (Donald) McDonald: The protagonist, who uses apple bombs as weapons. On the demo screen and the game's ending, Ronald is seen throwing soap bubbles into the air as entertainment.
- Mayor McCheese: A character resembling a cheeseburger. As the mayor of Donald Land, he wishes Ronald good luck on his quest.
- Birdie the Early Bird: A character resembling a breakfast meal (the "Morning Mac"). She is taken captive by a tribe of natives and Ronald must force its leader to surrender, freeing Birdie from her prison.
- Fry Guys: Characters resembling a box of French fries. Three of them are held hostage by a large animated skeletal snake.
- Grimace: One of Ronald's close friends, who is locked inside a jail cell by an evil red cyclops Grimace.
- Captain Crook: A character who tried to steal Filet-O-Fish sandwiches from citizens of McDonaldland. He is cloned into an evil Captain Cook that attacks Ronald at the harbor, while the real Captain Cook is locked in a cage being guarded by an octopus.
- Officer Big Mac (Police): Resembling a Big Mac in a police officer's uniform, he is the chief of police in the game. He is under attack by two bomb-throwing ghosts, forcing Ronald to save him.
- Hamburglar: A burglar who loves to steal hamburgers. The Hamburglar appears on the final level and is taken away the instant Ronald arrives in the castle to save him from the room he is being held in. An evil Hamburglar then appears out of a nearby frame and attacks Ronald. His catchphrase is “Robble Robble…”
- Professor: One of the two characters not saved by Ronald, he thanks him for saving McDonaldland.
- Uncle: The uncle of Donald's friend Grimace, his full name is Uncle O'Grimacey. He is the other character that is not saved by Ronald, appearing in the credits.
- Gumon: He is the final boss of the game, resembling a violent clown with scary shadows for his background. Gumon is an original character to the game and does not appear in any other McDonald's merchandise.

== Release and reception ==
Reception

Review score
Publication	Score
Famitsu	5/10, 7/10, 7/10, 6/10
