= Barbara Allyne Bennet =

American actress

Barbara Allyne Bennet (September 7, 1940 – January 9, 2016) was an American film, television and theater actress and union executive. Her acting career spanned more than fifty years. In addition to her on-screen credits, Bennet served on the national board of directors of the Screen Actors Guild (SAG) from 2005 to 2007. Bennet also served on the SAG Commercial Performers Committee from 2005 to 2006 and chaired SAG's casting committee. Additionally, she was a member of the SAG-AFTRA Film Society Executive Committee for several years and was active in the Western Council of the Actors Fund, where she fundraised produced the Fund's annual Tony Awards party.

== Life and career ==
Bennet was born in Cleveland, Ohio. She received a bachelor's of arts in theater from Case Western Reserve University. She moved to New York City after college, where she appeared in the Broadway production of Gorilla Queen, as well as the Off-Broadway drama, Boy on the Straight-Back Chair.

In the 1970s, Bennet relocated from New York to Hollywood to pursue film and television roles. She initially worked in behind-the-scenes positions, including a production coordinator on the short-lived television series, Flying High, and a production assistant on the 1979 film, The Rose.

In front of the camera, Bennett appeared as a lead scientist in the 1988 film, Mac and Me. Her television roles included guest appearances and recurring roles on Brothers & Sisters, Chicago Hope, NYPD Blue, Shameless, The Office and The West Wing. Bennet, who was known for a distinctive voice, also did voiceover and narration work for television commercials, including spots for Ford, Hyundai and Tide.

Bennet was a member of the Actors Alley Workshops and starred in several of the school's productions, including The Long Goodbye and The Trolls.

== Personal life ==
Bennet was married to Robert L. Randall, an actor.

== Death ==
Barbara Allyne Bennet died at City of Hope hospital in Duarte, California, on January 9, 2016, at the age of 76. Her memorial mass was held at St. Charles Borromeo Church, a Catholic church in North Hollywood on February 6, 2016.
