= Squire Fridell =

American actor (born 1943)

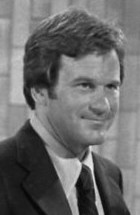
- Fridell in 1977
- Born: February 9, 1943 (age 83); Oakland, California, U.S.
- Education: University of the Pacific
- Occupations: Actor; author; winemaker
- Years active: 1968–1996
- Spouse: Suzanne McDermaid (m. 1977)
- Children: 1

Squire Fridell (born February 9, 1943) is an American retired actor, author, and winemaker who is widely known for his prolific work in the field of commercials; in the 1980s alone, Fridell served concurrently as spokesman for Toyota cars and McDonald's, portraying Ronald McDonald.

== Early life ==
Fridell was born in Oakland, California. He attended the University of the Pacific where he was a member of Phi Sigma Kappa fraternity.

== Career ==
Fridell began his acting career on stage in Southern California in 1968. In 1974 he was an acting teacher at El Rancho High School in Pico Rivera, California.

From 1978 to 2012, he was a spokesman in the American TV ads for the Toyota Motor Corporation. Fridell became the official Ronald McDonald clown character in 1985, after King Moody retired from the role after 16 years. He portrayed the character in the McDonald's Corporation television commercials and for the chain fast-food restaurants for six years until 1991. Besides the commercials, he also portrayed the character in the 1988 film Mac and Me and provided the voice of the character in the 1989 DiC animated film The Adventures of Ronald McDonald: McTreasure Island. From the 1970s until the mid-1990s, Fridell also had supporting character roles in a number of popular TV series, such as M*A*S*H, Newhart, Ironside and Adam-12.

In 1980, Harmony Books published Fridell's book, Acting in Television Commercials for Fun and Profit, subsequently re-released by Random House in 2005.

Fridell returned as himself in several Toyota commercials in 2010, responding to the image damage the company suffered due to a slow response to safety issues in 2009. Laurel Coppock's "Jan" succeeded Fridell as the company's advertising spokesperson in 2012 and remains to the present day.

He is also the co-owner and operator of GlenLyon Vineyards.

== Author ==
Fridell, Squire. Acting in Television Commercials for Fun and Profit, 4th Edition (2009). Penguin Random House.

== Personal life ==
Squire and Suzanne McDermaid (a professional dancer and dance teacher for many years) were married in 1977. They have one daughter, Lexy, who is pursuing an acting career in New York City. The family currently resides in Glen Ellen (in the Sonoma Valley region of California) where they have operated the GlenLyon Vineyards and Winery since 1989.

His sister Barbara is married to former NFL player and coach Tom Flores.

== Filmography ==
Year	Title	Role	Notes
1982	Pink Motel	George	
1983	Imps*	Newscaster	
1986	Miracles	Yates	
1988	Mac and Me	Ronald McDonald	
1990	The Adventures of Ronald McDonald: McTreasure Island	Ronald McDonald (voice)	Direct-to-video
1995	Village of the Damned	The Sheriff	

=== Television ===
Year	Title	Role	Notes
1970	The Bold Ones: The New Doctors	Dr. Jessup	Episode: "This Day's Child"
1970	Ironside	1st Attendant	Episode: "Little Dog, Gone"
1970	The Young Lawyers	George Nudavik	Episode: "Where's Aaron"
1970–1972	Adam-12	Palmer, Goldstone, Floyd Bannister	3 episodes
1972	The Strangers in 7A	Pete	Television film
1972	The Heist	Martin Galvin	Television film
1973	Police Story	Mod I.A. Man	Episode: "Man on a Rock"
1975	The Missing Are Deadly	Reporter #2	Television film
1976	Holmes and Yoyo	Albert	Episode: "Funny Money"
1977	Rosetti and Ryan	Frank Ryan	7 episodes
1978	Operation Petticoat	Lt. Meadows	Episode: "Tostin Times Two"
1978	Human Feelings	Phil Sawyer	Television film
1979	Vega$	Paul Baker	Episode: "The Eleventh Event"
1979	The Ropers	Bill	Episode: "Days of Beer and Rosie"
1979	Eight is Enough	Pete Burkus	Episode: "Mary, He's Married"
1981	M*A*S*H	Cpl. Alvin Rice	Episode: "Identity Crisis"
1984	Mama's Family	Frank Palmer	Episode: "Supermarket"
1984	Newhart	Uniform Officer	Episode: "Go, Grandma, Go"
1984	For Love or Money	Howard	Television film
1985–1991	McDonaldland	Ronald McDonald	45 episodes
1991	Midnight Caller	Bryon Walsh	Episode: "A Cry in the Night"
1992	Bay City Story	Douglas Turner	Television film

=== Video games ===
Year	Title	Role	Notes
1996	Top Gun: Fire at Will	Air Boss	
