= Mac and Me =

1988 film directed by Stewart Raffill

- Theatrical release poster
- Directed by: Stewart Raffill
- Written by: Steve Feke; Stewart Raffill
- Produced by: Mark Damon; William B. Kerr; R.J. Louis
- Starring: Christine Ebersole; Jonathan Ward; Katrina Caspary; Lauren Stanley; Jade Calegory
- Cinematography: Nick McLean
- Edited by: Tom Walls
- Music by: Alan Silvestri
- Production companies: Mac and Me Joint Venture
- Distributed by: Orion Pictures (United States); Vision International (International)
- Release dates: August 5, 1988 (Hong Kong); August 12, 1988 (United States)
- Running time: 99 minutes
- Country: United States
- Language: English
- Budget: $13 million
- Box office: $6.4 million

Mac and Me is a 1988 American science fiction film directed by Stewart Raffill, and co-written with Steve Feke. Starring Christine Ebersole, Jonathan Ward and Katrina Caspary alongside Lauren Stanley and Jade Calegory, it centers on a "Mysterious Alien Creature" (MAC) who escapes from NASA agents and befriends a boy named Eric Cruise. Together, the two search for Mac's family, from whom he has been separated.

The film performed poorly at the box office and was universally panned by critics, partly due to its similarity to E.T. the Extra-Terrestrial (1982) and its elaborate product placement of McDonald's and Coca-Cola. It was nominated for four Golden Raspberry Awards and won Worst Director and Worst New Star (for Ronald McDonald). However, it received four Youth in Film Awards nominations. Due to its poor reception, Orion Pictures cancelled the planned sequel. While regarded as one of the worst films ever made, it has for that reason become an ironic cult classic, and was featured during the twelfth season of Mystery Science Theater 3000.

== Plot ==
A family of aliens on a dying desert planet searches for subterranean water to drink through a straw. A NASA research probe lands and begins taking atmospheric samples via a suction device. The aliens are accidentally sucked into the apparatus, and the probe returns to Earth. The aliens escape from a government base with their ability to manipulate electricity and destroy anything they touch.

While three of them run into the desert, the smallest one hides in a passing minivan occupied by single mother Janet Cruise and her two sons (younger son Eric, who uses a wheelchair, and elder son Michael), who are moving to a new home near Los Angeles following the loss of her husband. Eric finds that the alien has trashed most of the new house and sees the being, but Janet blames him and Michael for what has happened. After noticing the alien outside, Eric tries to catch up to him but rolls down a hill in his wheelchair and falls into a lake, where he is rescued by the alien.

Later that night, Eric sets a trap with the help of his new friend, Debbie, the girl next door who has also seen the alien. They trap him inside a vacuum cleaner, which malfunctions and causes the neighborhood to suffer a power surge. Eric's behavior toward the alien, who he names Mac—an acronym for "Mysterious Alien Creature" (MAC)—changes after the extraterrestrial fixes the damage to the house and leaves behind several newspaper clippings that Eric believes are an attempt to communicate.

Meanwhile, FBI agents Wickett and Zimmerman track Mac down and spy on the Cruise residence. Eric disguises Mac in a teddy bear suit and takes him to a birthday party at a local McDonald's, where Debbie's older sister, Courtney, works. Wickett and Zimmerman follow, but Mac starts a dance number as a distraction and escapes with Eric. After Wickett and Zimmerman chase them, Eric and Mac are rescued by Michael and Courtney. Janet, having witnessed the chase, catches up to Wickett and Zimmerman and learns that Mac is real.

Eric, Michael, Debbie and Courtney decide to reunite Mac with his family, who are lost in the desert. Following Mac's directions, they travel to the mountains on the outskirts of Palmdale, where they find his dying family and rejuvenate them with Coca-Cola. The group goes to a supermarket to buy more Coca-Cola for the aliens. The restless aliens enter the supermarket, causing a panic. After Mac's father steals a firearm from a security guard, the police arrive, and a shootout takes place in the parking lot, which ends with the supermarket being destroyed in an explosion and Eric being killed by a stray bullet.

Once Wickett, Zimmerman and Janet arrive by helicopter, Mac and his family use their powers to revive Eric. For saving his life, the United States government grants them American citizenship, with the Cruise family and their neighbors, as well as Wickett and Zimmerman, at the ceremony. Mac's family, dressed like Earthlings, drives off in a pink Cadillac, and Mac blows a gum bubble that reads "We'll be back!"

== Cast ==
- Christine Ebersole as Janet Cruise
- Jonathan Ward as Michael "Mike" Cruise
- Katrina Caspary as Courtney
- Lauren Stanley as Debbie
- Jade Calegory as Eric Cruise
- Vinnie Torrente as Mitford
- Martin West as Wickett
- Ivan J. Rado as Zimmerman
- Danny Cooksey as Jack Jr.
- Laura Waterbury as Linda
- Jack Eiseman as Splatter Car Driver
- Jack David Walker as Mac's Father
- Barbara Allyne Bennet as Scientist
- Elena Moure as Mac's Mother
- Heather Green as Mac's Sister
- Gary Brockette as Doctor
- Raymond Forchion as Policeman #1
- Andrew Divoff as Policeman #2
- Bud Ekins as Gardner
- George Buck Flower as Security Guard
- Jack Ong as Technician
- Squire Fridell as Ronald McDonald (credited as Himself)
- Erin Wilkinson as Mac (uncredited)

In addition, Jennifer Aniston and Nikki Cox appear as uncredited background extras.

== Production ==
=== Development ===
Producer R.J. Louis had previously worked on advertising campaigns with McDonald's and had an association with their charitable arm Ronald McDonald House Charities (RMHC). He explained that at the time Ronald McDonald was "even more [well-known] than Santa Claus", but that E.T. was close behind and thus felt that the next "generation" needed an E.T. the Extra-terrestrial of their own. Louis was required to negotiate rights to use the McDonald's brand and its elements within the film. He pitched the project as a cross-promotional endeavor which could be promoted at its restaurants, and with its profits helping to support RMHC.

Some have reported that the film was at least partially financed by McDonald's, which Louis denies. However, he did receive funding from Golden State Foods, a food service distributor whose only client was McDonald's. Despite McDonald's specifying that they did not want Ronald McDonald to appear in the film, the character, played by Squire Fridell, nonetheless appeared in a scene set at a McDonald's which featured an extended dance sequence. The character also appeared in footage filmed exclusively for the theatrical trailer.

Louis noted that he was one of the first to leverage the chain as a platform for promoting films (Disney would later enter into a long-term deal with McDonald's to cross-promote properties including their classic films through in-store campaigns such as Happy Meals, although that relationship ended in May 2006, amid pressure to reduce the promotion of junk food to children).

Despite this, Louis remarked that he was "still the only person in the universe that ever had the exclusive motion picture rights to the McDonald's trademark, their actors, their characters and the whole company."

=== Stewart Raffill ===
Stewart Raffill, who had made a number of family films, was brought on as director even before the film had a completed script. He says he was recommended to the producer by James Brolin, with whom Raffill had made 1981's High Risk.

Raffill later recalled:

I was hired out of the blue. And the producer asked me to come down to the office. So I did and he had a whole crew there, a whole crew on the payroll. It was amazing. He had the transportation captain. The camera department head. The AD. The Production Manager. He had everybody already hired and I said, "Well, what's the script?" And he said, "We don't have a script. I don't like the script. You have to write the script. You're gonna have to write it quickly so prep the movie and write the script on the weekends."

The crew aimed to distinguish the film from E.T. by having Mac be a member of a family and having powers and skills.

Raffill says the producer wanted to use an actor who was handicapped. "So he found a kid who had spina bifida. The kid had never acted before, but he was a wonderful kid. But when they finished it was as if the fact that they used a real encumbered person to play the person didn't mean anything to even the people who lived in the world." Raffill says "the moment Disney heard we had this deal with McDonald's, they went in and hammered out a three-year deal to get all their toys put in their Happy Meals and have that relationship with Coca-Cola. As such, the McDonald's people were then not particularly enthused with us as they now had Disney, but they had to fulfill their arrangement with us."

=== Filming ===
In one scene, Eric Cruise (played by Jade Calegory, who has spina bifida and uses a wheelchair in real life) is seen rolling down a hill in his wheelchair. Raffill noted that Calegory performed a portion of the stunt himself, explaining that "it's very hard to do physical things when you're in that condition. It's very hard to make a wheelchair work because it's not a very balanced thing. When you start going fast in a wheelchair, you place tremendous risk on the child, so you have to try and figure out how to do that in a controlled fashion."

The shooting of Eric, although cut from most prints, was explicitly shown in the Japanese VHS release. For the film's mainstream release in theaters and on home video, this scene had been cut from the test screening phase of the film following negative reactions from test audiences; the altered version made it so that Eric would die offscreen.

During promotion for the film, the 12-year-old Calegory grew tired of explaining why he used a wheelchair, and started making deadpan jokes about how he had been injured in the Vietnam War.

== Music ==
Soundtrack

The film's soundtrack album was released by Curb Records, featuring one track from its musical score, composed, and conducted by Alan Silvestri, and the theme song "Take Me (I'll Follow You)" by Bobby Caldwell.

1988 Issue
| No. | Title | Length |
|---|---|---|
| 1. | "You're Not a Stranger Anymore (Theme from Mac and Me)" (Jara Lane) | 3:42 |
| 2. | "Take Me, I'll Follow You" (Bobby Caldwell) | 5:32 |
| 3. | "You Knew What You Were Doing (Every Inch of the Way)" (Marcy Levy) | 3:30 |
| 4. | "Down to Earth" (Ashford & Simpson) | 5:27 |
| 5. | "Waves" (Debbie Lytton) | 3:44 |
| 6. | "Send Out A Signal" (Larry Hart) | 4:31 |
| 7. | "Wait and Break My Heart Tomorrow" (The Flint River Band) | 4:40 |
| 8. | "Overture (Theme from Mac and Me)" (Alan Silvestri) | 4:24 |
| Total length: | | 35:50 |

Score

In 2014, Quartet Records released a limited edition disc (1000 copies) of Silvestri's complete score. The disc also includes "You're Not a Stranger Anymore (Theme from Mac and Me)" and "Take Me (I'll Follow You)," which Silvestri co-wrote for the film.

== Reception and legacy ==
=== Box office ===
The film premiered in Hong Kong on August 5, 1988, with a United States release following on August 12. A box office bomb, it grossed $6,424,112 in the U.S. against a $13 million budget. It had a profit-sharing arrangement with Ronald McDonald House Charities.

=== Critical response ===
Upon release, the film was widely panned due in part to its imitations of numerous concepts from Steven Spielberg's E.T. the Extra-Terrestrial (1982). Los Angeles Times critic Michael Wilmington wrote that it is "an amazingly bald-faced copy of E.T., even though this is E.T. in a sticky wrapper, left under the heater two hours too long. Almost everything in the earlier movie has a double here." Richard Harrington of The Washington Post amended the famed "E.T., phone home" phrase to "E.T., call lawyer" and said, "Why is it so hard to like this film? Having seen it done so much better by Spielberg doesn't help, of course."

Henry Mietkiewicz of The Toronto Star said that "it's a common complaint that movies are mass-produced like sausages. Case in point: MAC And Me. The only difference is that this excruciating children's movie is a hamburger right off the conveyor belt—McDonald's, to be exact. If only we could order 'One movie to go. And hold the schmaltz!' But no such luck. In fact, this shameless rip-off of E.T. [...] often looks and feels like a feature-length commercial."

The contrivance of the "Mysterious Alien Creature" (MAC) being referred to by the acronym-inspired "Mac" (a seemingly innocuous reference to the McDonald's hamburger called the "Big Mac", as well as a dance number featuring mascot Ronald McDonald), and the characters' wearing of McDonald's clothing, prompted Deseret News journalist Chris Hicks to declare: "I'm not sure I've ever seen a movie that is as crass a 90-minute commercial as Mac and Me."

Hicks, along with Caryn James of The New York Times, observed additional promotion of Coca-Cola and Sears—the latter brand carried McKids, the McDonald's line of children's clothing. James also took exception to the "awfully irresponsible" treatment of wheelchair-using main character Eric Cruise, who is placed in potentially dangerous situations before Mac intervenes.

Gene Siskel of the Chicago Tribune gave it a 1 1/2 star rating, and wrote, in a capsule review:

This is what happens when someone doesn't make a sequel to a hit movie fast enough. Someone else, with a lot of brass, makes a ripoff that is even less satisfying. Mac and Me is a pale carbon copy of E.T., with an alien creature who looks like a cross between E.T. and Yoda, hiding out at a suburban California house where only the kids and the government believe the creature really exists. Can the kids save the creature and get him reunited with his family? This may sound benign, but there are two problems: dozens of brazen commercial plugs and a couple of truly frightening scenes with a child in a wheelchair going over a cliff and nearly drowning and, later, being pronounced dead after a fire.

On review aggregator Rotten Tomatoes, the film has a 7% approval rating based on 28 reviews, and an average rating of 3.4/10. The site's consensus reads, "Mac and Me is duly infamous: not only is it a pale imitation of E.T., it's also a thinly-veiled feature length commercial for McDonald's and Coca-Cola." On Metacritic, the film has a score of 26 out of 100 based on 12 critics, indicating "generally unfavorable reviews".

Despite the overwhelmingly negative reviews, Calegory's performance was named a highlight of the film by several critics, with Richard Harrigan of The Washington Post praising the young actor's "healthy authenticity" in his role. The filmmakers also garnered praise for their use of a disabled protagonist yet without making the disability a central part of the story.

The film is widely regarded as one of the worst movies, with The Telegraph noting that it is "frequently pulled out in 'worst film of all time' arguments". Filmmaker Morgan Spurlock cited it as the most egregious example of product placement in cinema history, as well as the "worst thing you'll ever see in your entire life". It was also named the worst film ever in the San Francisco Chronicle, as well as by broadcaster Simon Mayo, and writer/producer Damon Lindelof. Michael Hayden of GQ India referred to it as "hands down the worst family movie in Hollywood history."

Nathan Rabin reviewed the film as part of his "My Year of Flops" series for The A.V. Club, writing:

Mac and Me was designed as an especially brazen knock-off of E.T.: The Extra-Terrestrial. Instead, it plays like an indecent bizarro-world incarnation of Steven Spielberg's beloved family classic. E.T. is a marvel of daring, inspired character design that somehow manages to look simultaneously ugly and adorable, but Mac is a repulsive little monster that looks like an overgrown, horrifically scarred fetus covered with blisters. [The] creepy little alien’s mouth is permanently fixed in the O shape of a blow-up sex doll, though the average blow-up sex doll is more animated and has more dignity than Mac. [The] alien doesn’t move, so much as he twitches and burbles randomly; over the course of the film, its hideousness and comic inexpressiveness engenders morbid fascination. Suspension of disbelief becomes impossible: Mac is never anything more than a poorly manipulated puppet.

=== In popular culture ===
Despite the box office failure, the movie has nevertheless become a cult film. Lindelof allowed that it is "the fifth-best alien comedy ever made," and it has appeared in various "so-bad-it's-good" listings. Jim Vorel of Paste ranked it no. 52 in "The 100 Best 'B Movies' of All Time" (noting that it cannot be "enjoyed un-ironically"), while Cracked journalist Jeff Steinbrunner placed it at no. 1 in "The 10 Most Shameless Product Placements in Movie History", calling it "unintentionally awesome" and "almost genius." Complex wrote: "As an accidentally riotous failure, Mac and Me comes highly recommended, but its real purpose requires a line of shot glasses...everyone must take a shot whenever Raffill's film displays one of its countless product placements."

The film is part of a running gag between late-night host and comedian Conan O'Brien and actor Paul Rudd. When appearing as a guest on Late Night with Conan O'Brien, O'Brien's later shows Conan and Conan O'Brien Must Go, and O'Brien's podcast Conan O'Brien Needs a Friend, Rudd would perform a "bait-and-switch" by routinely showing the same clip from it (in which Eric, watched by Mac, loses control of his wheelchair and falls down a hill into a lake) instead of showing clips from the actual films and TV shows he was ostensibly promoting.

While giving an interview alongside Captain America: Civil War costar Chris Evans in 2016, Rudd expressed his appreciation of its "blatant" advertising of McDonald's, "unearned" positioning of Bobby Caldwell ballad "Take Me (I'll Follow You)", and inclusion of a fly landing on Mac's nose, declaring: "I love it...it's so good." Evans also professed to "love" the film, noting that he "grew up on it."

The film is one of six movies featured in season 12 of Mystery Science Theater 3000.

The podcast How Did This Get Made? reviewed the movie in episode 10, featuring guest host Adam Pally.

=== Canceled sequel ===
A sequel was announced at the time of the film's release. It ends with the text "We'll be back!", but given its unpopularity, a sequel did not happen. Producer R.J. Louis spoke of the ending in a 2017 interview and did not rule out a sequel. He claimed there is public interest because home video sales have made the film profitable for Orion Pictures, and also said that Mac would resonate with modern, young moviegoers.

=== Awards ===
| Award | Date | Category | Recipient | Result |
|---|---|---|---|---|
| Golden Raspberry Awards | March 29, 1989 | Worst Picture | R.J. Louis | Nominated |
| Golden Raspberry Awards | March 29, 1989 | Worst Director | Stewart Raffill | Won |
| Golden Raspberry Awards | March 29, 1989 | Worst New Star | Ronald McDonald | Won |
| Golden Raspberry Awards | March 29, 1989 | Worst Screenplay | Stewart Raffill and Steve Feke | Nominated |
| Youth in Film Awards | May 6, 1989 | Best Family Motion Picture: Animation or Fantasy | | Nominated |
| Youth in Film Awards | May 6, 1989 | Best Young Actor in a Motion Picture: Comedy or Fantasy | Jade Calegory | Nominated |
| Youth in Film Awards | May 6, 1989 | Best Young Actress in a Motion Picture: Comedy or Fantasy | Tina Caspary | Nominated |
| Youth in Film Awards | May 6, 1989 | Best Young Actress in a Motion Picture: Comedy or Fantasy | Lauren Stanley | Nominated |

== See also ==
- List of 20th century films considered the worst
- Flight of the Navigator
- My Little Bossings
- Nukie
