= Michael Polakovs =

American clown (1923–2009)

- Polakovs dressed as Coco the Clown
- Born: 23 February 1923; Riga, Latvia
- Died: 6 December 2009 (aged 86); Ashland, Kentucky, U.S.
- Occupations: Clown, actor
- Years active: 1951–1990
- Spouses: Lillian Polakovs (divorced); Hazel Polakovs (m. 1959)
- Children: 6
- Parent: Nicolai Poliakoff (father)

Michael Polakovs (Latvian: Mihails Poļakovs, 23 February 1923 – 6 December 2009) was a Latvian-born American circus clown and actor, who performed in the US under the name of Coco the Clown, a moniker that his father, Nicolai Poliakoff, had made famous in Europe.

== Early life ==
Michael was born in Riga, Latvia. He was the eldest of Nicolai and his wife Valentina's two sons; they also had four daughters. Nicolai was offered a contract to tour the UK with the Bertram Mills Circus in 1930, which allowed him to bring his wife and their two elder children, Michael and his sister Helen, to England. The rest of the family joined them in 1934. Michael joined his father in the circus ring, clowning and stiltwalking. Many circuses were closed following the outbreak of the Second World War in 1939, and during the early part of the war Michael was employed by the Ascot Gas Board to dig holes in roads, for £2 16s 6d a week. Nicolai and his family succeeded in finding employment with the Blackpool Tower Circus after it was decided that it would remain open during the war. Michael and his sister Tamara appeared in each summer season until 1946, and toured during the winter months with stage circuses organised by impresario Tom Arnold.

Bertram Mills Circus reopened in 1946, and the Polakovs rejoined it the following year. Michael and his younger brother, Sasha (Saša), performed alongside their father as augustes, and also developed a stilt-walking act with their sister, Sasha. During one performance in 1947, Michael saved the life of animal trainer Nicolai Trifonidis by rushing into the enclosure and dragging him free of the lions that were mauling him.

== Career ==
Michael joined Billy Smart's Circus in 1951, and toured the US with the Mills Brothers Circus in 1953. He returned to the US in the late 1950s, performing under his father's name of Coco the Clown with the Ringling Bros. and Barnum & Bailey Circus. He was hired by the McDonald's fast-food chain in 1966 to revamp the character of Ronald McDonald, for whom he designed the outfit and make-up still in use today. Michael also appeared in the first eight television commercials featuring the new character.

Michael retired to Catlettsburg, Kentucky, with his second wife, Hazel, with whom he had one son and one daughter. He also had four children from his first marriage, one of whom, Graham, also became a clown.

== Death ==
Michael died on 6 December 2009 in Ashland, Kentucky, at the age of 86.
