= Ronald McDonald =

Clown mascot of McDonald's

- McDonald's character
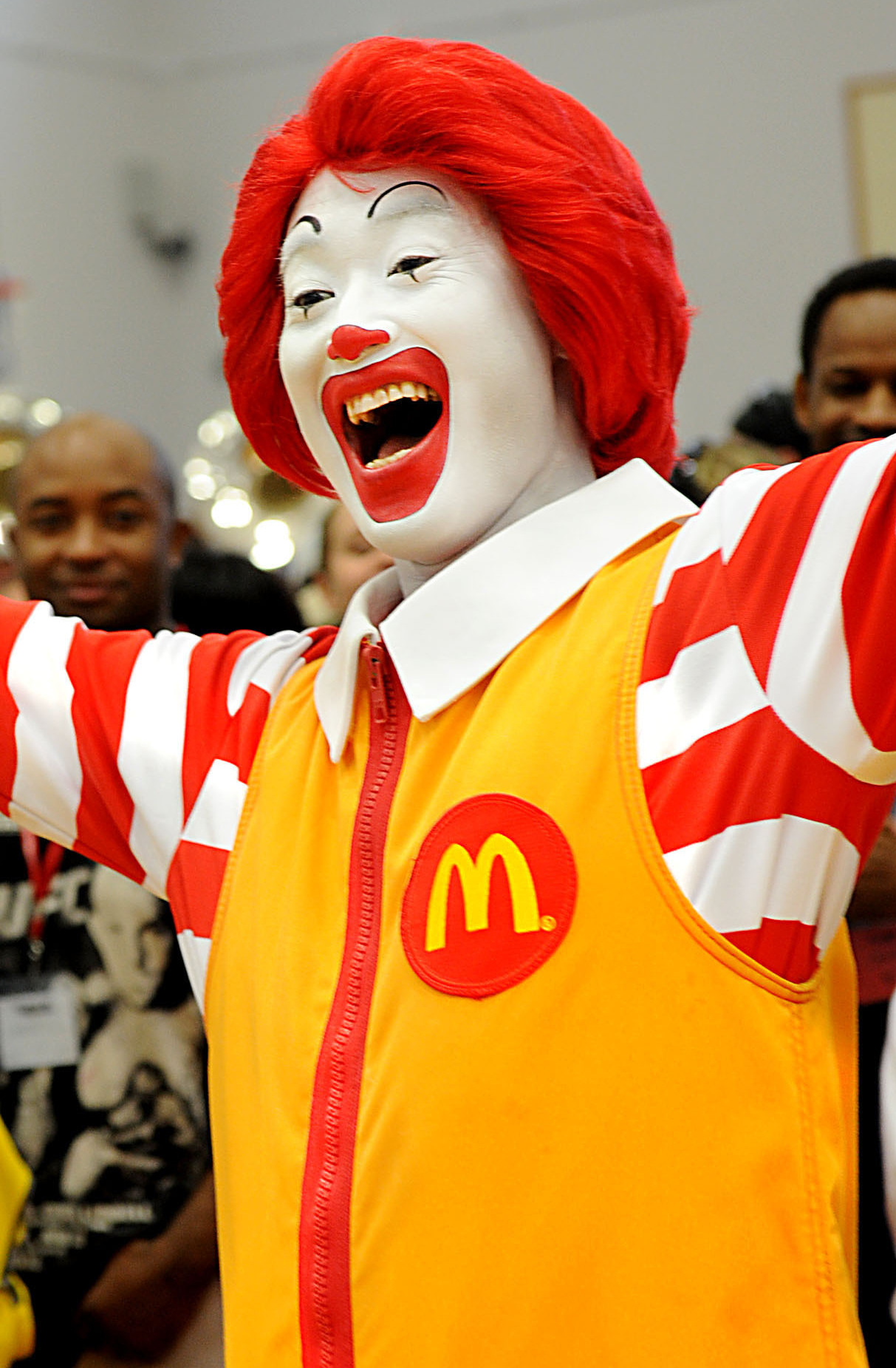
- A Ronald McDonald performer in Okinawa, Japan, 2011
- First appearance: 1963; 63 years ago
- Portrayed by: Willard Scott (1963–1965); Michael Polakovs (1965–1968); Ray Rayner (1968–1969); King Moody (1969–1985); Squire Fridell (1985–1991); Jack Doepke (1991–1999); David Hussey (2000–2014); Brad Lennon (2014–)
- Voiced by: Squire Fridell (Ronald McDonald and the Adventure Machine, The Adventures of Ronald McDonald: McTreasure Island); Jack Doepke (The Wacky Adventures of Ronald McDonald; ep. 1–3); David Hussey (The Wacky Adventures of Ronald McDonald; ep. 4–6, McKids Adventures: Get Up and Go with Ronald)

In-universe information
- Gender: Male
- Occupation: Clown mascot for the McDonald's fast food chain
- Home: McDonaldland

Ronald McDonald is a clown character used as the primary mascot of the McDonald's fast-food restaurant chain. He inhabits the fictional world of McDonaldland, with his friends Mayor McCheese, the Hamburglar, Grimace, Birdie the Early Bird, and The Fry Kids.

Many people work full-time making appearances as Ronald, visiting children in hospitals and attending regular events. At the character's height, there may have been as many as 300 full-time Ronald McDonalds at McDonald's restaurants. There are also Ronald McDonald Houses, where parents can stay overnight with their sick children in nearby chronic care facilities.

== History ==
The television commercial debut of Ronald McDonald (1963)

=== Washington, DC ===
"Ronald McDonald, the Hamburger-Happy Clown" debuted in 1963 in three separate local television advertisements. They were created by the advertising agency of Oscar Goldstein, who also owned a McDonald's franchise in the Washington, D.C., area. The advertisements featured Willard Scott as Ronald; Scott had played Bozo the Clown on WRC-TV in Washington from 1959 to 1962 and was an employee of Goldstein at the time.

Scott, who went on to become NBC-TV's Today Show weatherman, recounted the creation of the character in his book Joy of Living:

At the time, Bozo was the hottest children's show on the air. You could probably have sent Pluto the Dog or Dumbo the Elephant over and it would have been equally as successful. But I was there, and I was Bozo ... There was something about the combination of hamburgers and Bozo that was irresistible to kids ... That's why when Bozo went off the air a few years later, the local McDonald's people asked me to come up with a new character to take Bozo's place. So, I sat down and created Ronald McDonald.

McDonald's does not specify a creator of the character in its official statement of the character's history.

On March 28, 2000, Henry Gonzalez, McDonald's Northeast Division President, thanked Scott for creating Ronald McDonald during a taped tribute to Scott on the Today Show.

=== Nationwide rollout ===
The character first appeared in national TV advertising in 1965, during the Macy's Thanksgiving Day Parade, and followed with spots during the 1965 NFL Championship Game.

Circus performer Coco the Clown (real name Michael Polakovs) was hired in 1966 to revamp Ronald's image, creating the now familiar costume and make-up.

In 2010, Corporate Accountability International suggested Ronald McDonald should retire due to childhood obesity. However, McDonald's CEO Jim Skinner said there are no plans to retire him.

In 2011, McDonald's announced that Ronald McDonald will reappear in their commercials, but Ace Metrix stated Ronald McDonald ads are no longer effective. Subsequently, Corporate Accountability International renewed their call to retire Ronald McDonald by running ads in major newspapers and launching several web pages dedicated to the retirement of the character. However, McDonald's CEO Jim Skinner defended Ronald McDonald by saying that he is an ambassador for good and "it's all about choice". Shortly after, McDonald's announced that Ronald McDonald was "here to stay".

In 2014, McDonald's announced that Ronald McDonald would have a whole new look and new outfits. They also announced that he would be featured in their new commercials as well as on social media websites like Twitter. As part of Ronald's makeover, his jumpsuit has been dropped in favor of yellow cargo pants, a vest and a red-and-white striped rugby shirt; his classic clown shoes remain part of the official uniform.

=== 2025 return ===
On August 5, 2025, McDonald’s published a press release announcing that the character, along with other characters from McDonaldland series, would be returning after two decades since its last appearance. The characters would be returning to promote a meal in a new commercial.

== Actors ==
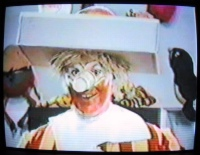
Willard Scott as Ronald McDonald, from the first of three pre-recorded television advertisements to feature Ronald

At any given time, there are dozens to hundreds of actors retained by McDonald's to appear as Ronald McDonald in restaurants and events. It is assumed, however, that the company uses only one actor at a time to play the character in national television commercials. Following is a list of primary American Ronald McDonald actors.

- Willard Scott (Washington, D.C. 1963–1965)
- Bev Bergeron (Southern California, 1966–1968)
- George Voorhis (Southern California, 1968–1970)
- Don Sandburg (1967–1968) (local)
- Michael Polakovs (1965–1968)
- Ray Rayner (1968–1969)
- Viv Weekes (1968–1970) (local)
- Bob Brandon (1970–1975) (local)
- King Moody (1969–1985)
- Squire Fridell (1985–1991)
- Jack Doepke (1991–1999)
- David Hussey (2000–2014)
- Brad Lennon (2014–) (local)

Various forms of the name "Ronald McDonald" as well as costume clown face persona, etc. are registered trademarks of McDonald's. McDonald's trains performers to portray Ronald using identical mannerisms and costume, to contribute to the illusion that they are one character. McDonald's marketing designers and stylists changed elements of the Ronald McDonald character, persona, style, costume and clown face when they adopted the clown as a trademark.

=== Joe Maggard claim ===
An actor named Joe Maggard claimed to have performed as Ronald McDonald from 1995 to 2007, though these dates overlap with the portrayals by Jack Doepke and David Hussey. In a 2003 article by The Baltimore Sun, a spokesperson for McDonald's said that Mr. Maggard was simply a stand-in for Ronald for one commercial shoot in the mid-1990s, and stated that "he is definitely not Ronald McDonald."

== International localization ==
In Thailand, Ronald McDonald greets people in the traditional Thai wai greeting gesture of both hands pressed together. The Thai version of the company mascot was created in 2002 by the local Thai franchise, McThai, as part of a "McThai in the Thai Spirit" campaign. The figure has also been exported to India and other countries where a similar gesture is used. In China, out of respect for Ronald McDonald as an adult, children refer to him as "Uncle McDonald" (麦当劳叔叔; Màidāngláo Shūshu).

In Japan, Ronald McDonald was known as "Donald McDonald" (ドナルド・マクドナルド, Donarudo Makudonarudo) due to a lack of a clear "r" sound in Japanese enunciation. This name was changed back to "Ronald McDonald" (ロナルド・マクドナルド, Ronarudo Makudonarudo) per October 1, 2026.

== Licensed works ==
The original Ronald McDonald as pictured on the United States trademark application filed in 1967

=== Books ===
Charlton Comics obtained the license to publish four issues of a Ronald comic sold on newsstands in 1970–1971. Over the years, several giveaway comics have also been produced starring the character.

Ronald (with Grimace) appeared in the 1984 Little Golden Book Ronald McDonald and the Tale of the Talking Plant, which was written by John Albano and illustrated by John Costanza.

In 1991, Ronald appears in the Discover the Rainforest activity book series, which are written by Mike Roberts and Russell Mittermeier, Gad Meiron, and Randall Stone, and illustrated by Donna Reynolds and Tim Racer, in which he is seen here as a nature show host and tour guide.

=== Animation ===
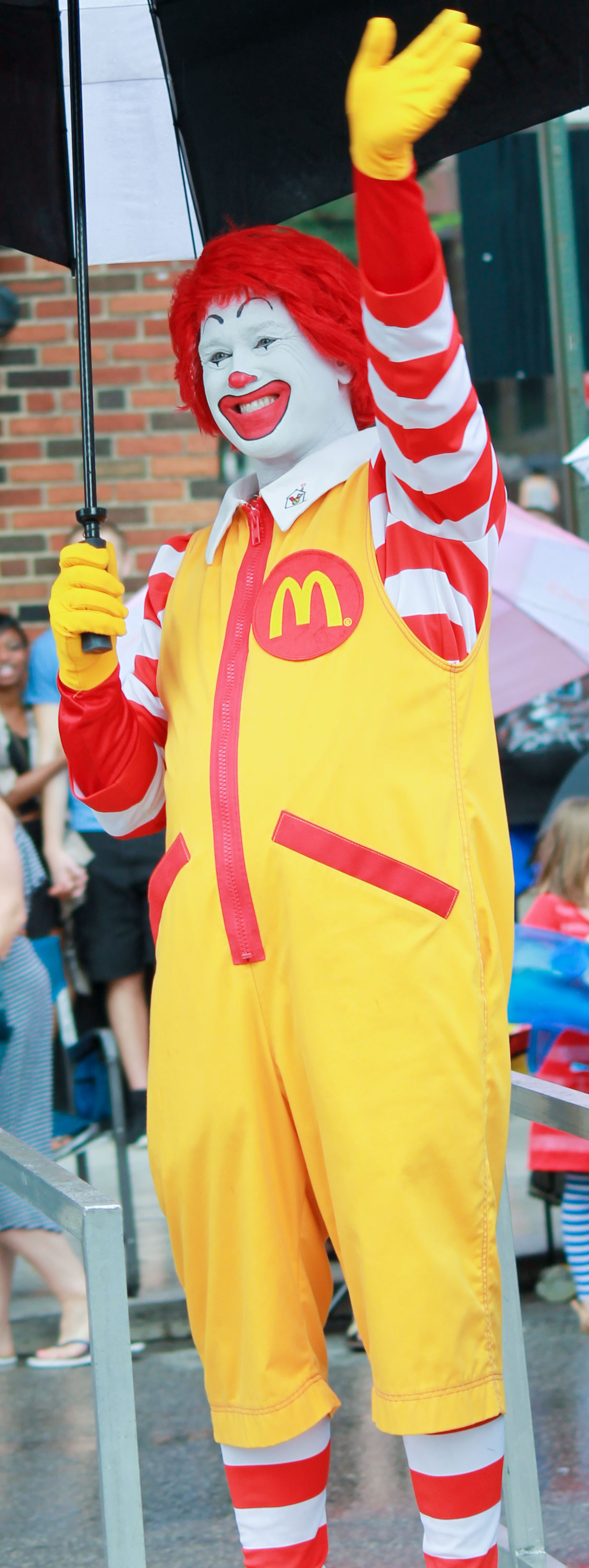
A Ronald McDonald costumed character

In 1987, Ronald McDonald (with Birdie, Hamburglar, Grimace and the Professor) appeared in an eight-minute animated short film titled Ronald McDonald and the Adventure Machine, which was only shown during birthday parties at McDonald's restaurants.

In 1990, a 40-minute animated direct-to-video film titled The Adventures of Ronald McDonald: McTreasure Island and produced by DIC Entertainment was released on VHS by Hi-Tops Video.

From 1998 until 2003 a series of direct-to-video animated episodes titled The Wacky Adventures of Ronald McDonald and produced by Klasky Csupo were released in participating McDonald's worldwide on VHS.

=== Video games ===
Ronald McDonald is the protagonist of three video games: Donald Land, developed by Data East for the Famicom console, released only in Japan in 1988; McDonald's Treasure Land Adventure, developed by Treasure for the Mega Drive console and released in 1993; and Ronald McDonald in Magical World, developed by SIMS for the Game Gear handheld, released only in Japan in 1994. When the cartridge is inserted into a Western Game Gear, the game will automatically play in English and Ronald's original English name is also retained.

He is also featured in two more video games: M.C. Kids for NES, Game Boy, C64, Amiga, Atari ST, and MS-DOS; and Global Gladiators for Genesis, Master System, Game Gear and Amiga.

=== Film ===
Ronald McDonald appears for a few seconds in the 1988 film Mac and Me during a birthday scene set at a McDonald's. He is played by Squire Fridell, but is credited as "Ronald McDonald as himself". He won a Golden Raspberry Award for Worst New Star for his appearance in the film. The character also appeared in footage filmed exclusively for the film's theatrical trailer.

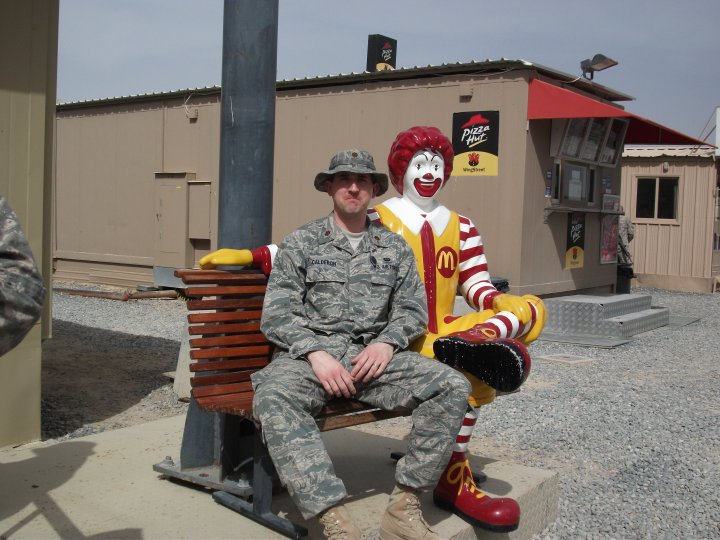
Ronald McDonald statue (right) at a military base in Southwest Asia

== Subversion ==
Ronald McDonald's prominence has made him a symbol for McDonald's as well as Corporate America, capitalism and globalization. His costume and iconography are often appropriated by protestors and artists wishing to subvert the icon and communicate an anti-corporate message. For example, in 2000, protestors in Hong Kong dressed as Ronald McDonald to protest the labor policies of McDonald's in China.

In 2010, the Oscar-winning animated short Logorama prominently featured a depiction of Ronald McDonald as a criminal on the run from the police.

== Criticism and 2016 appearances ==
In 2011, a group of 550 physicians and other health professionals took out newspaper ads, saying that Ronald McDonald should be retired. The ads argued that McDonald, and mascots, were outdated for fast food companies, and that his portrayal is used to unethically advertise to children.

Ronald McDonald has made fewer appearances since 2016 due to the 2016 clown sightings. However, as of 2025, he was still appearing at live events and on social media.
