= Spot: The Cool Adventure =

1992 video game

- North American cover art
- Developer: Visual Concepts
- Publisher: Virgin Games
- Designer: Cary Hammer
- Artist: Dean Lee
- Composer: John Loose
- Series: Spot
- Platform: Game Boy
- Release: EU: 1992; NA: January 1993; JP: February 11, 1994
- Genre: Platform
- Mode: Single-player

Spot: The Cool Adventure is a 1992 platform game developed by Visual Concepts and published by Virgin Games for the Game Boy. It is a port of the NES game, M.C. Kids. The Game Boy version was released outside of Europe and was localized with the 7 Up mascot Spot as Spot: The Cool Adventure.

The game structure is based on M.C. Kids, although the map screen closely resembles Super Mario Bros. 3. Getting hit causes players to lose health. In addition to avoiding enemies, Spot can jump or collect blocks to help him reach hearts in other locations.

== Reception ==
Power Unlimited gave a score of 65%. They found the gameplay addictive but very difficult, and the game music as "rather unnerving."

== See also ==
- Cool Spot
- Spot: The Video Game
