= M.C. Kids =

1992 platform video game

- Cover of the North American NES version
- Developers: Virgin Games (NES); Visual Concepts (GB); Arc (PC, Amiga, ST); Miracle Games (C64)
- Publishers: NA: Virgin Games; EU: Ocean Software
- Producers: Justin Heber; C64: Micheal Merren
- Designers: Darren Bartlett; Gregg Iz-Tavares; GB: Cary Hammer
- Artists: NES: Darren Bartlett; PC, ST, Amiga: Jon Harrison; C64: Debbie Sorrell; GB: Dean Lee
- Composers: NES: Charles Deenen; PC, ST, Amiga: Andi McGinty; C64: Henry Jackman; GB: John Loose
- Platforms: NES (original); Game Boy, C64, Amiga, Atari ST, MS-DOS
- Release: NES: NA: February 1992; EU: May 1993; Game Boy, C64, Amiga: EU: 1992; Atari ST: EU: 1993; PC: EU: 1993; NA: February 1992
- Genre: Platform game
- Modes: Single-player, multiplayer

M.C. Kids (McDonaldland) is a 1992 platform video game developed and published by Virgin Games. It was initially released for the Nintendo Entertainment System in February 1992 in North America, and by Ocean Software in May 1993 in Europe. As a licensed product for the McDonald's fast food restaurant chain, the game stars two children named Mack and Mick who venture into the fantasy world of McDonaldland in order to return Ronald McDonald's magical bag which has been stolen by the Hamburglar. The game was created by four people in eight months: Darren Bartlett (art and level design) Gregg Iz-Tavares and Dan Chang (programming) and Charles Deenen (audio).

M.C. Kids was ported to the Commodore 64, Amiga, Atari ST and MS-DOS as McDonaldland which was only sold in Europe. The NES release in Europe had the same name as the home computer ports. A different version of the game was published for the Game Boy also called McDonaldland; outside of Europe it was re-themed for the Cool Spot franchise and released as Spot: The Cool Adventure. Virgin would later make another McDonald's-themed video game titled Global Gladiators, which was released in 1992.

== Gameplay ==
The main menu

The player can choose to play as one of the two "M.C. Kids". There is no difference between the two characters aside from their skin color and hair styles. The game has an alternating two player mode, and both characters can walk, jump, duck and pick up blocks to throw at enemies as they travel through the seven large worlds of magical McDonaldland.

In a similar format as Super Mario Bros. 3 or StarTropics, the game has seven different worlds. Each one starts out with a visit to a McDonaldland character. However, unlike games such as Super Mario Bros. 3, simply defeating the various levels is not enough for success. McDonald's franchise imagery found in this game includes the various characters from restaurants and television commercials, and McDonald's cards and Golden Arches—all of which are variously available for plot advancement and as power-ups.

Novel gameplay mechanics found in M.C. Kids include a spin device that turns the player upside down and reverses gravity, the ability to warp throughout the current level via a zipper, and a boat that can be both ridden and carried.

== Plot ==
Front cover of the European NES version

The game begins with the titular M.C. Kids, Mick and Mack, reading a storybook about Ronald McDonald showing off his magical bag at a picnic in the meadow. Suddenly, the Hamburglar appears and steals Ronald's Magic Bag. Mick and Mack then search outside Ronald's clubhouse for four of the puzzle cards. After collecting four of the puzzle cards, Mick and Mack are told by Ronald that the Hamburglar was sighted near Birdie's treehouse.

Upon arriving at Birdie's treehouse, Mick and Mack search her house for five of her puzzle cards. After finding her puzzle cards, Mick and Mack are told that the Hamburglar is sighted near the cliffs.

Following the directions given by Birdie, Mick and Mack arrive at Grimace's loft in the Highlands and search his house for three of his puzzle cards. After finding two more cards, Grimace lets them head down a path to the Professor's workshop.

When Mick and Mack reach the Professor's workshop, they find that he has invented something to help them in their quest. He then has Mick and Mack find five of his puzzle cards.

Using the rocket that the Professor gave to them, Mick and Mack head to the moon to visit CosMc. They meet up with CosMc on the moon at his getaway where he tells him to find five of his puzzle cards. After collecting his cards, CosMc tells Mick and Mack to find an entrance to a volcano as the Hamburglar might be hiding out there.

Mick and Mack brave the scary volcano in their efforts to find the Hamburglar and the Magic Bag. When they find the Hamburglar, he tells them that the Magic Bag escaped from him. After collecting all six of his cards, Mick and Mack confront the Magic Bag where it launches a tied flag, a magic wand and then a rabbit in a hat in order to attack. When the Magic Bag is defeated, the game ends with Mick and Mack returning the bag to Ronald.

== Marketing ==
The magazine advertisement for M.C. Kids, featuring a mohawked Darren Bartlett, was actually taken as he was hanging upside-down on the Virgin Games sign.

== MC Mario ==
In some countries, an unofficial, modified version of the game titled MC Mario is known to exist. This version of the game is identical to the original, except that the player characters have been replaced with Nintendo's Mario Bros as they appear in the 1988 game Super Mario Bros. 3.

In 2003, Gregg Tavares, programmer of the original M.C. Kids game, made a blog post acknowledging MC Mario. In the post, he states that while he found the hack interesting, he was disappointed to see his work being ripped off.

== Reception ==
Reception

Review scores
Publication	Score
GamePro	4.6/5 (Note: GamePro gave M.C. Kids three 5/5 ratings for sound, gameplay, and fun factor and two 4/5 scores for graphics and challenge.)
Nintendo Life	6/10
Nintendo Power	3.23/5 (Note: Nintendo Power scored M.C. Kids 3.3/5 twice for challenge and theme/fun, 3.4/5 for play control, and 2.9/5 for graphics/sound.)
N-Force	81/100
Total!	77%
Power Unlimited	68/100(Game Boy and NES)

Critics from GamePro and N-Force praised the original mechanics of M.C. Kids, such as its Spinner blocks, Zipper entrances, and hidden puzzle cards, which they suggested made it superior and competitive with other platform games, such as those in the Mario series. In 2010, Nintendolife's retrogaming review scored M.C. Kids at 6 out of 10, finding it to have a "generally uneven difficulty level" but also "colourful graphics, imaginative Sid and Marty Krofft-esque level and enemy design, innovative game physics, and exceptionally jocular score." Power Unlimited reviewed the Game Boy version and found it similar to the NES version and they reviewed the NES version commenting: "McDonalds Land is one of the cheapest games of all time. Basically it's just the game Cool Spot, but with some changed graphics. Fortunately, Cool Spot was a good game, so for McDonalds fans, this should be a dream come true."

Programmer Gregg Tavares expressed disappointment at the poor reception of M.C. Kids, especially after later and similarly styled games from Virgin received more attention.

== See also ==
- Global Gladiators
- McDonald's Treasure Land Adventure
