= McDonald's Treasure Land Adventure =

1993 video game

- North American cover art
- Developer: Treasure
- Publisher: Sega
- Director: Koichi Kimura
- Producer: Masato Maegawa
- Programmer: Masato Maegawa
- Artist: Koichi Kimura
- Composer: Katsuhiko Suzuki
- Platform: Sega Genesis
- Release: JP: September 23, 1993; NA: December 1993; EU: March 1994
- Genre: Platform
- Mode: Single-player

McDonald's Treasure Land Adventure (Note: Japanese: マクドナルドトレジャーランドアドベンチャー, Hepburn: MakuDonarudo Torejā Rando Adobenchā) is a 1993 platform game developed by Treasure and published by Sega for the Sega Genesis. Based on the McDonald's fast food restaurant chain, specifically its McDonaldland marketing campaign, players control Ronald McDonald in his efforts to retrieve the missing pieces of a map that lead to the location of a buried treasure from a group of villains. Ronald can defeat enemies by using a magic attack and can latch onto hooks with his scarf to reach higher platforms.

Treasure Land Adventure was developed by Treasure in conjunction with the run and gun video game Gunstar Heroes (1993). Sega commissioned Treasure to design a McDonald's game after the company was ineligible to receive a publishing contract to develop games for the Genesis. Treasure president and project programmer Masato Maegawa mandated that the game had to be faithful and respectful to the McDonald's licensing and characters during production.

Both at release and retrospectively, the game was praised for its gameplay and graphical style and is cited as one of the better licensed games from the era.

== Gameplay ==
Ronald using his magic attack against enemies in Magical Forest, the first world of the game

McDonald's Treasure Land Adventure is a platform game based on the McDonaldland advertising campaign. The story follows Ronald McDonald and his friends—Grimace, Hamburglar, Birdie the Early Bird, and the Fry Kids—discovering a piece of a treasure map during a walk through the forest, with the other three pieces having been stolen by a group of villains. Ronald sets out to retrieve the missing pieces and find the location of the treasure.

The player controls Ronald throughout the game's four worlds: Magical Forest, Magical Town, Magical Sea, and Magical Moon, which are divided into three stages each. Ronald can shoot a forward-moving magic attack to defeat enemies, and can use his scarf to attach to grapple hooks to reach higher platforms. Ronald's health is represented by red jewels, and he will drop one when he is hit by an enemy or falls into a pit. Throughout the game, Ronald can collect bags of gold that can be used in stores found in certain levels. These stores sell a variety of items, including additional jewels, power-ups that increase the strength of his magic attack, and balloons that allow him to safely glide over enemies and obstacles. The third level of each world concludes with an end-level boss that must be defeated by letting them suck up one of Ronald's jewels; Ronald can find one of his friends in these levels that provide him tips for defeating these bosses.

== Development and release ==
McDonald's Treasure Land Adventure was developed by Treasure, a company founded by Masato Maegawa and a group of former Konami employees. Maegawa formed Treasure in 1992 after he and his team became frustrated with Konami's growing reliance on developing sequels to established series, such as Castlevania and Teenage Mutant Ninja Turtles, and wanted to focus on creating new and original titles. Treasure had begun working on its first game, the 'run and gun' platformer Gunstar Heroes (1993), when it was unable to secure a publishing contract with Sega as Treasure lacked a proven track record. Sega instead contracted Treasure to develop a game based on the McDonald's fast food franchise, specifically its McDonaldland marketing campaign.

Treasure Land Adventure was developed in conjunction with Gunstar Heroes, sharing several of its staff members. Koichi Kimura served as the game's director, with Maegawa assisting as producer and Katsuhiko Suzuki composing the soundtrack. The team needed to design original enemies and characters apart from the ones in the McDonaldland franchise. They abandoned many of their ideas for not fitting the feel of McDonaldland. Suzuki composed the soundtrack with this same mindset. Maegawa maintained that Treasure Land Adventure had to remain respectful and faithful to the McDonald's licensing and characters, in a manner similar to licensed games featuring characters like Mickey Mouse. Treasure Land Adventure helped familiarize Treasure with the hardware of the Sega Genesis, which became essential for its later projects. The game was completed before the development of Gunstar Heroes concluded, however, Treasure decided to delay Treasure Land Adventure and release Gunstar Heroes first as it wanted its debut to be an original title.

Treasure Land Adventure was released in Japan on September 23, 1993, and was promoted in 1,000 McDonald's restaurants in the country. Sega forecast the game to sell over 500,000 copies. It was published in North America in December 1993 and in Europe in March 1994. The North American version replaces the tribesmen enemies in the first world with robots, presumably to avoid black stereotypes. The European version is more difficult than the other releases, with the player beginning with less health and enemies taking more damage.

In 2021, a YouTuber called edwardbeluha discovered an easter egg in the password menu, being a 3D tech demo where the player can scale and rotate the model. In an interview with Retro Gamer, Masato Maegawa revealed that the demo was intended as a test for the boot-up animation of a cube for the Treasure logo.

== Reception ==
Reception

Review scores
Publication	Score
Aktueller Software Markt	9/12
Consoles +	83%
Electronic Gaming Monthly	37/50
Famitsu	25/40
GameFan	356/400
GamePro	16/20
Mean Machines Sega	81/100
Mega Fun	81%
Video Games (DE)	72%
Mega Drive Advanced Gaming	66%
Sega Magazine	76/100
Sega Pro	84/100

The critical consensus upon release was that McDonald's Treasure Land Adventure was one of the better examples of a licensed game during the 16-bit console era. Four reviewers from GameFan reacted with surprise to the game's quality, with one saying it boasted the same hardware-pushing graphics and gameplay as Gunstar Heroes. Mean Machines Sega writer Paul Gus shared a similar amount of surprise: "Why on earth Treasure would want to devote so much effort to a game only to make it so very easy is a mystery. Yet this they flippin well done did!" He compared the game to Gunstar Heroes for showcasing Treasure's talent at designing enjoyable and memorable side-scrollers. The graphics were highlighted for being colorful and visually-pleasing; Gus was fond of its vibrant colors and attention to detail. A reviewer for Electronic Gaming Monthly complimented the large, item-filled levels and cameos from other McDonaldland characters, as did Consoles+ writer Richard Homsy. The latter was also impressed with the game's presentation and soundtrack for staying in tune with the theme and design. Lance Boyle of GamePro believed younger players would be attracted to the colorful visuals and McDonald's branding, but older players would find little to offer.

Retrospective feedback on Treasure Land Adventure has also been positive, though critics believe it lacks the same polish and technological power present in its other works like Gunstar Heroes and Dynamite Headdy. Kurt Kalata of Hardcore Gaming 101 believes it served as a base for Treasure's later games, such as Dynamite Headdy, with similar mechanics and musical composition. Kotaku's Luke Taylor commended the game for being far above the usual quality of licensed titles, with an interesting graphical style and solid gameplay. Though he was critical of its short length and extensive usage of blind jumps, he strongly recommended it for platformer fans. Paul Staddon, a writer for Retro Gamer, found some of Treasure Land Adventure's ideas innovative for the genre, and possessing fun gameplay and colorful visuals. He wrote: "It's not the best game in Treasure's library, but it is very entertaining and just about worth the high eBay prices that it currently sells for. If you're looking for an unconventional platformer then give it a whirl. You won't be disappointed."
