= McKids =

Retail clothing chain

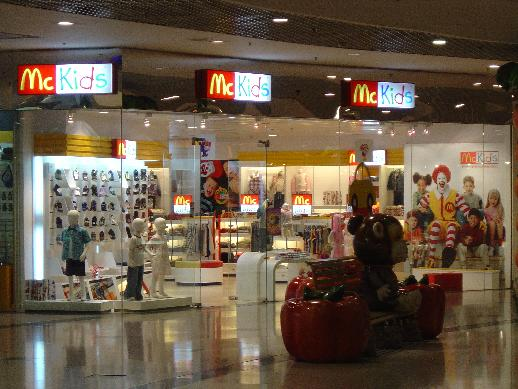
- Industry: Clothing

McKids was a chain of clothing stores marketed to children and operated by the McDonald's Corporation through a partnership with Sears.

== Overview ==
In July 1987, Sears began selling the McKids line of children's clothing along with McDonald's. In December 1988, Sears opened the first seven free-standing McKids stores. In early 1991, all 47 free-standing McKids stores were closed. The McKids line of clothing continued to be sold at Sears stores. In 1997, McKids clothing began to be sold exclusively at Walmart. McDonald's exclusivity agreement with Wal-Mart ended at the end of 2003, and in 2004 the McKids brand was launched internationally, with 15 stores being opened in China.
