= Randall Stone =

American political scientist

Randall Warren Stone (born February 21, 1966) is an American political scientist and a professor at the University of Rochester, notable for his studies on international political economy, international relations, and Russian and European politics.

Stone has conducted research on global economy, the International Monetary Fund, the World Bank, and institutional design, and in 2012, was awarded the International Studies Association’s Chadwick F. Alger Prize for his book, Controlling Institutions: International Organizations and the Global Economy. Director of the Skalny Center for Polish and Central European Studies at the University of Rochester, Stone speaks Russian, German, and Polish, and frequently travels to the region. Stone is also the author of Lending Credibility: The International Monetary Fund and the Post-Communist Transition (Princeton, 2002) and Satellites and Commissars: Strategy and Conflict in the Politics of Soviet-Bloc Trade (Princeton, 1996).

Stone earned a B.A. in government at Harvard University in 1988, and a Ph.D. in political science at Harvard University in 1993. He has been awarded grants by the NSF, SSRC, NCEEER, and IREX, and was a Senior Fulbright Scholar in Berlin. His articles have appeared in the American Political Science Review, International Organization, International Studies Quarterly, The Journal of Conflict Resolution, and Review of International Relations, and Global Environmental Politics. Stone has also been cited by The New York Times, CNBC, PBS News, and Foreign Policy magazine for his insight into current affairs in Ukraine and Crimea.

== See also ==
- International Monetary Fund
