= Philadelphia Ronald McDonald House =

First of the namesake American charities

Coordinates: 39°57′20″N 75°12′04″W

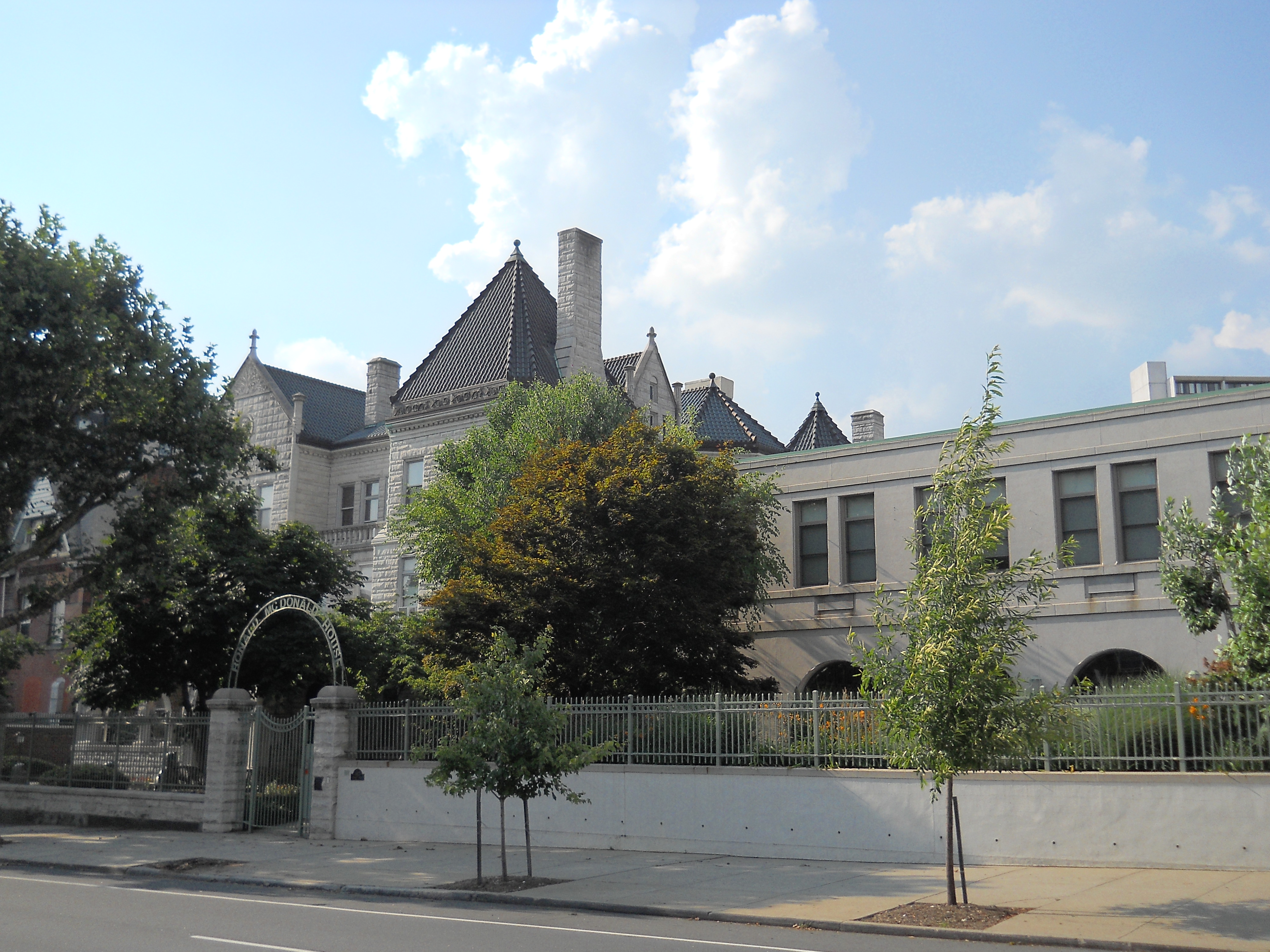
Ronald McDonald House in Philadelphia

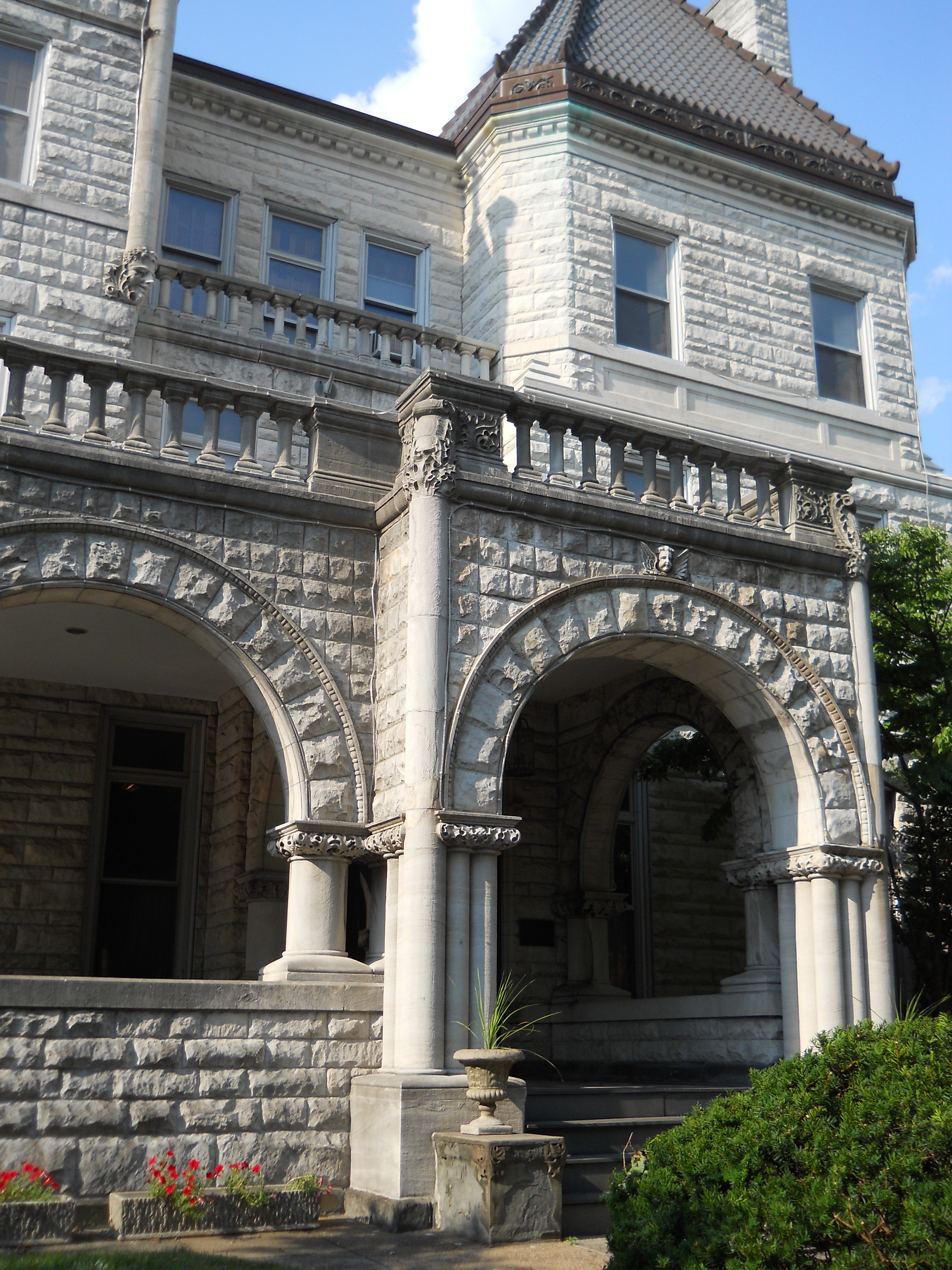
Building entrance

The Philadelphia Ronald McDonald House was the first of the Ronald McDonald House Charities and now stands at 39th and Chestnut Streets in West Philadelphia.

== History ==
On October 15, 1974, the first Ronald McDonald House opened at 4032 Spruce Street with room for seven families. The House opened with the help of Philadelphia Eagles manager Jimmy Murray and The Children's Hospital of Philadelphia's Pediatric Oncologists Dr. Audrey Evans and Dr. Milton 'Mickey' Donaldson. In the early 1970s, Drs. Evans and Donaldson saw families spending night after night in the hospital while their children received medical care. She knew there had to be a better way and envisioned a house where families could stay. At the same time, the Philadelphia Eagles were fundraising in support of player Fred Hill's daughter, Kim, who was battling leukemia. Jimmy Murray met with Dr. Evans and committed to supporting her dream for a house. He approached their advertiser McDonald's for support and they agreed to fund the house through Shamrock Shake sales. In 1981, the House changed locations to 3925 Chestnut Street increasing the number of bedrooms to 19. This was then increased again in 1995, adding 24 rooms to a total capacity of 43 rooms through an expansion largely funded by U.S. Healthcare. Years later, one bedroom was added to the mansion side of the house and in 2009 a lounge was converted into another bedroom—the 45th bedroom at Chestnut Street.

Since opening the first House, located on Chestnut Street, it has grown to 72,000 square feet (6,700 m^{2}) to accommodate a total of 45 families. In 2008, a second 27,000 square feet (2,500 m^{2}) house was opened with 18 guest rooms, located at 100 E. Erie Avenue, next to St. Christopher's Hospital for Children. In 2014, two additional bedrooms were added. The house now has a total of 20 guest bedrooms.

In 1986, the Philadelphia Ronald McDonald House established a one-week oncology summer camp for children with cancer and their siblings.

In 2006, the first Ronald McDonald Family Room was opened at The Children's Hospital of Philadelphia in the Oncology Unit. The Family Room provides a hospitality setting for families staying with their children in the hospital. The room offers a family-style dining table, seating, kitchen facilities, and a guest bathroom. There is also a laundry room equipped with a washer and dryer, a folding station, detergent, and laundry baskets. The room also provides a television/DVD/VCR system. In 2008, a second Family Room was built in the Cardiac Unit.

In 2013, a Hospitality Kiosk was built in the Critical Care Unit at St. Christopher's Hospital for Children. The Kiosk offers individually packaged snacks, foods, baked goods, and microwaveable meals; coffee/tea; and other beverages. It also includes complimentary toiletries, books, magazines, board games, and other activities. In addition, there is a resource area with flyers, brochures, and other items that are helpful to families.

=== Building ===
The Victorian-era Romanesque mansion was built in 1893 for William James Swain, the son of Philadelphia Public Ledger editor and publisher William Moseley Swain by architect Will Decker. Swain died in 1903. In 1926, the house was sold to the Andrew Bair Funeral Home, who sold it decades later to the Ronald McDonald House.

== Mission ==
The Philadelphia Ronald McDonald House supports families of seriously ill children by creating a community of comfort and hope.

== Structure of the house ==
The Ronald McDonald House is run by a core group of full-time paid employees along with a large rotating staff of volunteers. They provide accommodations for immediate families of those receiving treatment and outpatient patients mostly from Children's Hospital of Philadelphia, Temple University Hospital, Hospital of the University of Pennsylvania, Wills Eye Institute, and Shriner's Hospital. Stays in the house range from one night to more than a year.

== See also ==
- Ronald McDonald House New York
