= Mary L. Marazita =

American geneticist

- Born: Cheboygan, Michigan, US
- Spouse: Dick McCoy (m. 1984)

Academic background
- Education: BS, animal husbandry, 1976, Michigan State University; PhD, genetics, 1980, University of North Carolina at Chapel Hill
- Thesis: Genetic analysis of triglycerides, total cholesterol, high density lipoprotein cholesterol, and blood pressure in a large pedigree (1980)
- Doctoral advisor: Robert C. Elston

Academic work
- Institutions: University of Pittsburgh School of Dental Medicine; VCU School of Medicine; University of California, Los Angeles
- Main interests: FaceBase; Cleft lip and cleft palate

Mary Louise Marazita is an American geneticist. She is a Distinguished Professor at the University of Pittsburgh School of Dental Medicine.

== Early life and education ==
Marazita was born in Cheboygan, Michigan to parents Philip and Eleanor Marazita. She graduated with her bachelor's degree in animal husbandry from Michigan State University and her PhD in genetics from the University of North Carolina at Chapel Hill. She wrote her thesis under the guidance of Robert C. Elston. Following her PhD, Marazita completed her post-doctoral training in craniofacial biology at the University of Southern California from 1980 to 1982.

== Career ==
Upon completing her formal education, Marazita accepted a faculty appointment at the University of California, Los Angeles' Departments of Biostatistics and Biomathematics. Following this, she joined the VCU School of Medicine, where she established the state of Virginia’s Birth Defects Registry and served for five years as Director of the FaceBase Consortium Hub. In 1993, Marazita joined the University of Pittsburgh School of Dental Medicine (Pitt). In 2000, Marazita received a $369,963 grant from the National Institute of Dental Research for a gene mapping study of cleft lip in the populations of Shanghai, China and West Bengal, India. Dr.Marazita's research focuses on the human genetics of complex traits.

During her tenure at Pitt, Marazita established the Pittsburgh Oral-Facial Cleft Study "which seeks to find the genes underlying non-syndromic clefts by studying families that include at least two affected family members." By 2009, Marazita was working as the School of Dental Medicine's associate dean for research, director of the Center for Craniofacial and Dental Genetics, and professor and vice-chair of the Department of Oral Biology. While serving in these roles, Marazita assisted with the establishment of FaceBase, a five-year initiative "to provide the craniofacial and dental research community with a resource to achieve a comprehensive understanding of craniofacial and dental development." Following this, she was the recipient of a 2011 chancellor’s award for distinguished teaching, research and public service.

The main focus of Marazita's research is on oral hygiene and genetics, often combining the two subjects. Some of her most popular work has to do with the study of the genetics of cleft lip and palate, genetics of early-onset deafness, and the heritability of autism. Throughout her career, Marazita has published hundreds of articles ranging from genetics to medicine. As of 2025, she is still conducting research and posting articles about dental hygiene and genetic diseases.

During the COVID-19 pandemic, Marazita was the recipient of the 2020 Distinguished Scientist Award in Craniofacial Biology Research from the International Association for Dental Research. A few days later, she was awarded the designation of distinguished professor from the University of Pittsburgh School of Dental Medicine.

== Personal life ==
Marazita married her husband Dick McCoy in 1984 and they have five children together. She serves as an advisory board member of the Chrons Basketball Club.
