= Eric Chien-Wei Liao =

American craniofacial surgeon and researcher

- Education: MD, PhD, Harvard-MIT, 3000
- Occupations: Pediatric surgeon and researcher

Eric Liao is an American pediatric surgeon-scientist. He specializes in plastic and reconstructive craniofacial surgery, especially in the surgical treatment of cleft lip and palate, rhinoplasty, otoplasty, and nasal reconstruction. Liao's research interests are focused on the genetics and developmental biology that govern facial formation and craniofacial anomalies. He is the founding director of the Center for Craniofacial Innovation at the Children's Hospital of Philadelphia, the Vice Chair of Academic Affairs in the Department of Surgery, and a Professor of Surgery at the University of Pennsylvania Perelman School of Medicine.

== Career ==
Liao attended Stanford University, where he graduated with B.S. and M.S. in biological sciences. He began his professional career at Harvard Medical School in 1995, where he earned his M.D. in the Health Sciences and Technology program at Harvard and M.I.T. and graduated with a Ph.D. in genetics in 2002. For his dissertation, Liao studied transcriptional regulation of hematopoiesis with Len Zon at Boston Children's Hospital in the early days of genomic infrastructure development for the zebrafish as a vertebrate experimental model.

Liao trained in surgery at the Massachusetts General Hospital and plastic surgery at Brigham and Women's Hospital and Boston Children's Hospital from 2002 to 2008. He was appointed as faculty in the Department of Surgery at Massachusetts General Hospital, in the Division of Plastic and Reconstructive Surgery, from 2008 to 2022. While at Mass General, Liao joined the Center for Regenerative Medicine and the Harvard Stem Cell Institute, where he built a research program investigating the genetic basis of craniofacial development. Liao led the MGH Department of Surgery as the Vice Chair of Surgery of Research, where he overhauled the educational and research programs for faculty and trainees to enhance academic training and mentorship. He directed the Cleft and Craniofacial Program at Mass General Hospital for Children and Shriners Hospital in Boston from 2015 to 2022 and served as the Director of Pediatric Plastic Surgery. In 2021, Liao was appointed to Professor of Surgery at the Harvard Medical School. He also led the Shriners Children's Boston as Chief of Staff from 2021 to 2022.

In 2022, Liao was recruited to the Children's Hospital of Philadelphia as the Surgery Vice Chair of Academic Affairs and Professor of Surgery at the University of Pennsylvania Perelman School of Medicine. At CHoP, Liao founded the Center for Craniofacial Innovation and was named the Director of the Center and the Presidential Scholar Endowed Chair to lead this institute.

== Contributions ==
Liao used the zebrafish animal model to study human craniofacial malformations, generating key zebrafish models of orofacial cleft genes such as IRF6, ESRP1, and ESRP2. As a principal investigator in the Developmental Gene Annotation Project and the FaceBase consortium funded by the National Institutes of Health, Liao and his collaborators identified genes associated with various craniofacial conditions, including Tessier clefts, orofacial clefts, arrhinia, and frontonasal dysplasia
