= Center for Applied Genomics =

Research center in Philadelphia, US

Coordinates: 39.94745°N 75.19549°W

- Type: Genomics Research Center
- Industry: Medical Research
- Founded: 2006
- Headquarters: Philadelphia, United States
- Area served: United States
- Key people: Hakon Hakonarson, Director
- Number of employees: 89
- Parent: Children's Hospital of Philadelphia
- Website: http://www.caglab.org

The Center for Applied Genomics is a research center at the Children's Hospital of Philadelphia that focuses on genomics research and the utilization of basic research findings in the development of new medical treatments.

As one of the world's largest genetics research and analytical facilities, the Center for Applied Genomics has processed genetic samples from over 100,000 people due to its access to high-throughput genotyping technology.

The center is focused on detecting the genetic causes of prevalent childhood diseases including asthma, obesity, ADHD, autism, diabetes, inflammatory bowel disease, epilepsy, schizophrenia, and pediatric cancer, all of which are thought to potentially involve multiple, interacting genes within the body.

== Projects ==
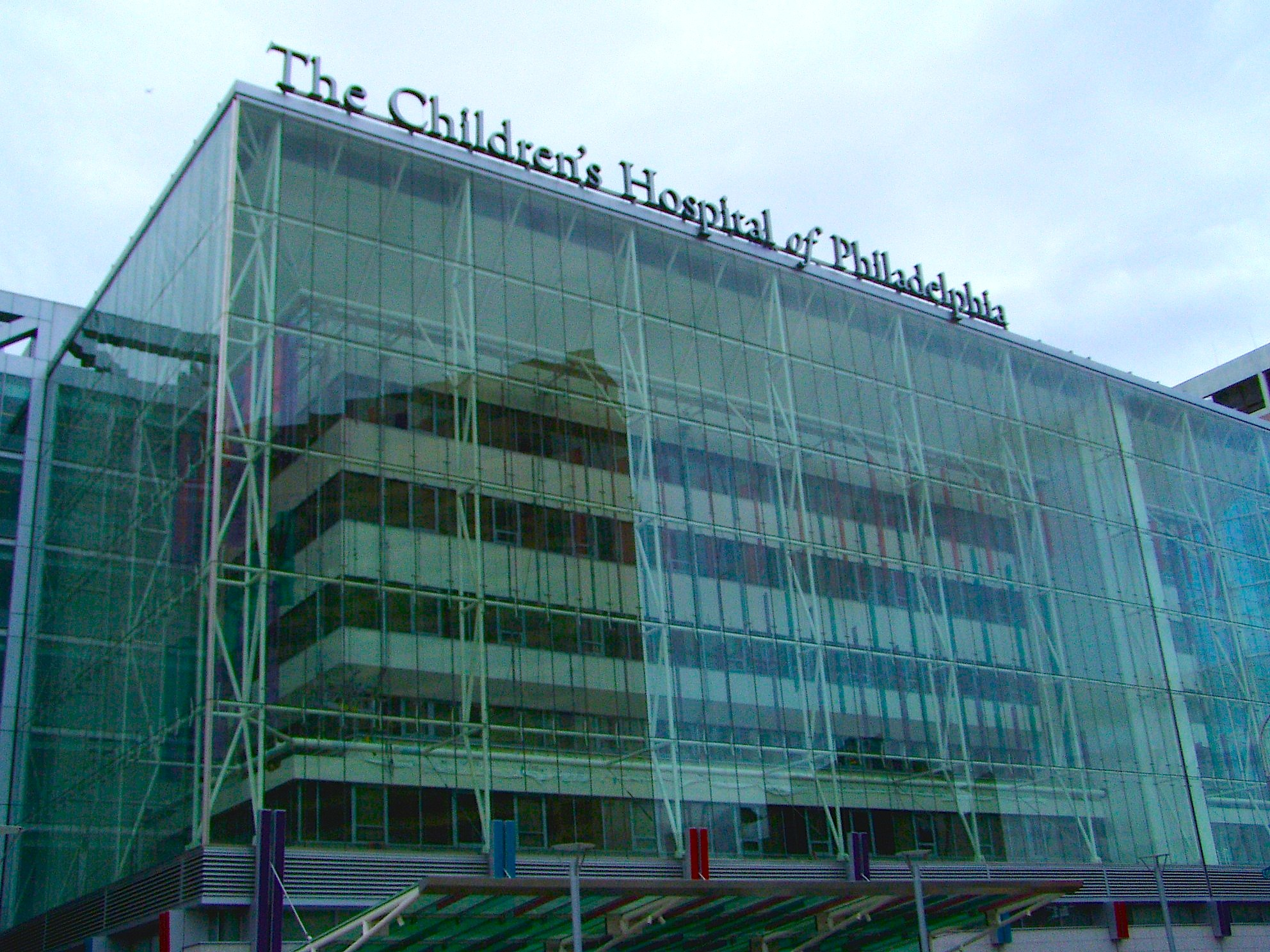
The Center for Applied Genomics is a Center for Emphasis at the Children's Hospital of Philadelphia

=== ADHD ===
In 2009, Center for Applied Genomics researchers identified copy number variants (CNVs) as a potential cause of the disorder. Although highly heritable, genetic correlates of attention deficit hyperactivity disorder (ADHD) have been difficult to pinpoint. The group found 222 CNVs that were more common in individuals with ADHD than in unrelated healthy individuals and published a paper on the findings.

=== Asthma ===
In 2010, the center published a genome-wide association study of 3,377 children with asthma and 5,579 healthy children. Researchers discovered a region on chromosome 17 and a previously unassociated region on chromosome 1 that strongly correlated with susceptibility to asthma.

=== Autism ===
In 2009, the Center conducted a genome-wide association study on a group of 780 families (3,101 individuals) with affected children, a second group of 1,204 affected individuals, and 6,491 controls, all of whom had European ancestry. By comparing genomics variations between the groups, researchers identified six genetic markers between two specific genes that confirmed susceptibility to ASDs. In 2009, the Center published a second paper in the journal Nature that identified copy number variations (CNVs) as genetic features in autism based on the study of 859 autism cases and 1,409 healthy children of European ancestry.

=== Cancer ===
In 2008, the Center group collaborated with the Maris Lab at the Children's Hospital of Pennsylvania to publish the first of three papers on the genetic causes of Neuroblastoma. They performed a genome-wide association study comparing the genomes of 1032 patients and 2043 controls. The researchers found a significant association between neuroblastoma and a region of chromosome 6. In 2009, the Center performed another genome-wide association study that focused on a 397-person high-risk subset of the neuroblastoma group. In 2009, the Center contributed another study identifying copy number variations (CNVs) as a potential cause of neuroblastoma. The study was the first germline CNV study in any cancer.

In 2009, in collaboration with the Nathanson Lab at the University of Pennsylvania, the Center published the results of a genome-wide associated study that examined the genomes of 227 patients with testicular germ cell tumors and 919 controls.

=== Crohn's Disease ===
In 2008, the Center proposed a strategy for examining the disorder by focusing on age-of-onset. To this end, they carried out a genome-wide association study of 1,011 individuals with pediatric-onset IBD and 4,250 matched controls. In a subsequent paper, the Center applied pathway analysis to focus on multiple regions in the genome that may interact to cause Crohn's disease.

In 2009, the center also published a genome-wide association study of inflammatory bowel diseases (Crohn's disease and ulcerative colitis) in 3,426 affected individuals and 11,963 genetically matched controls.

=== Schizophrenia ===
In a genome-wide association study of 1,735 schizophrenic patients and 3,485 healthy adults.

=== Type 1 Diabetes ===
In 2007, researchers performed a genome-wide association study in a large pediatric group that identified a previously unknown association between type 1 diabetes and a genetic variation on chromosome 16.

== Technology ==
The center is equipped with the Illumina BeadArray System and utilizes both the Infinium and GoldenGate analytical methods. The center's equipment includes multiple Tecan hardware systems and scanning instruments with integrative Laboratory Information Management System (LIMS). It uses several genotyping units from Affymetrix.

The center uses microarrays to perform whole-genome analysis – microarrays are slides consisting of thousands to millions of tiny probes. They allow researchers to screen an individual's genome for huge numbers of genetic markers called single nucleotide polymorphisms (SNPs). At the center, researchers have examined over 100,000 individuals.

== See also ==
- Penn Genome Frontiers Institute
