= Hákon Hákonarson (scientist) =

Icelandic genomics researcher and physician

- Born: 1960; Akureyri, Iceland
- Citizenship: Iceland; USA
- Education: University of Iceland
- Scientific career
- Fields: Genomics; bioinformatics; translational medicine
- Workplaces: Children's Hospital of Philadelphia; University of Pennsylvania

Hákon Hákonarson (born 1960) is an Icelandic genomics researcher and physician. He is the founder and director of the Center for Applied Genomics, endowed chair in genomics at the Children's Hospital of Philadelphia, and a professor of pediatrics at the Perelman School of Medicine at the University of Pennsylvania.

== Biography ==
Hákon was born in Akureyri. He studied at the Akureyri Junior College and received a medical degree from the University of Iceland in 1986. He completed a pediatrics residency at the University of Connecticut and then a pediatric pulmonology fellowship at the University of Pennsylvania. He received a PhD from the University of Iceland in 2002.

=== DeCode ===
In 1998 he returned to Iceland to join the Icelandic genetics research firm DeCode. Alongside that he worked as a pediatrics attending at the National University Hospital of Iceland. Hákon became vice president of clinical sciences and development at DeCode.

=== Center for Applied Genomics ===
Hákon founded the Center for Applied Genomics (CAG) at the Children's Hospital of Philadelphia in 2006. The hospital has committed to genomically characterizing over 100,000 children with CAG, which has resulted in the development of new rare disease therapies.

In 2009, TIME listed his autism gene discovery project, reported in Nature in 2009, among the "top 10 medical breakthroughs" of that year. Hakonarson's paper on a novel precision based therapy in rare lymphatic disorders was awarded among the Top 10 clinical/translational papers in 2019 by the Clinical Research Forum.

Hakonarson's NFC-1 program addressing mGluR signaling in a subset of patients with ADHD and autism, was acquired by Medgenics in 2015, following a proof-of-concept study based on genetic stratification.

He is a highly cited researcher with an h-index of 179 as of 2024.

He is also an attending physician in pulmonary medicine at the Children's Hospital of Philadelphia.
