= Madeline Bell (hospital executive) =

Nurse, hospital administrator

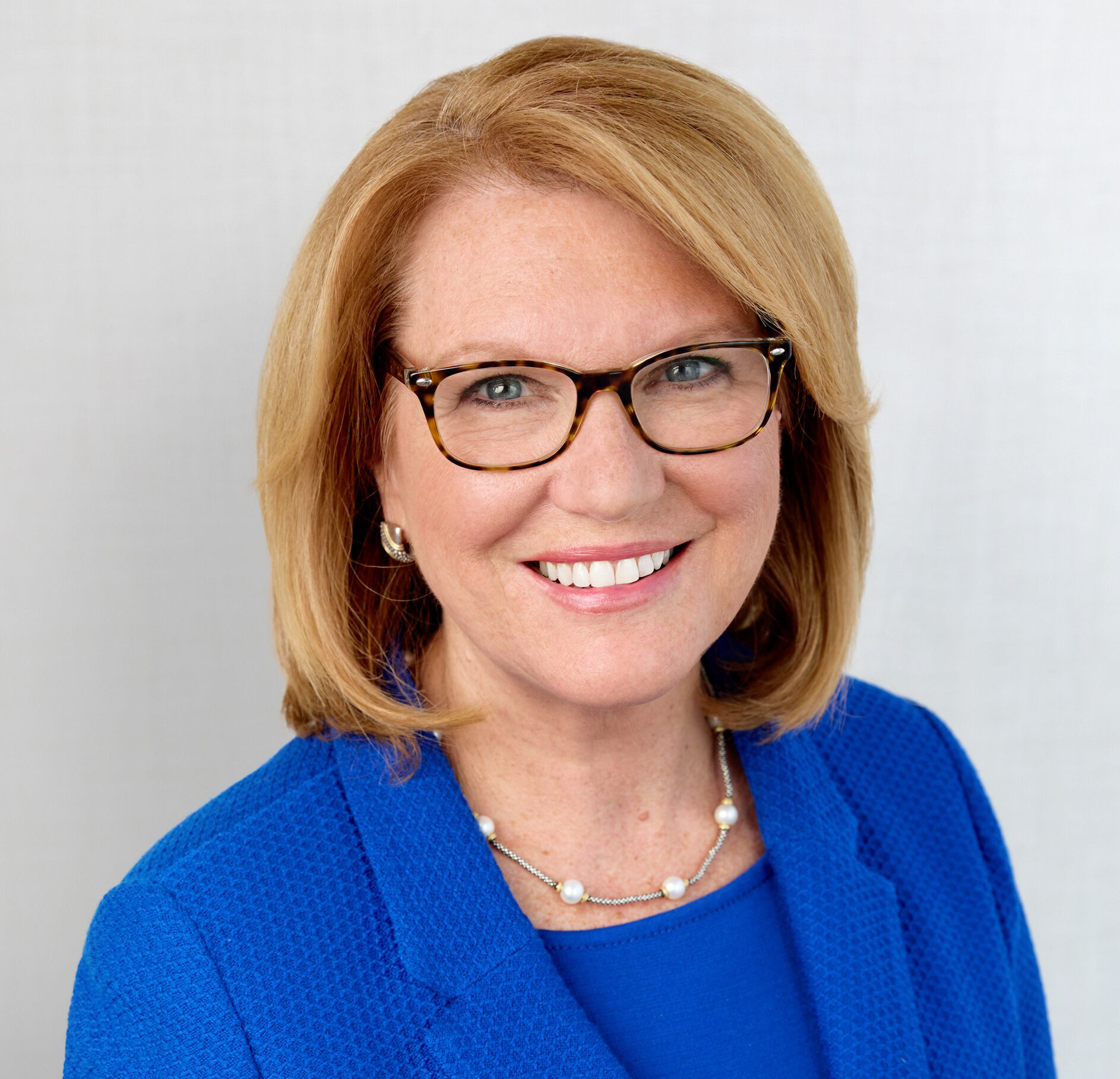
- Madeline Bell in 2022
- Born: May 11, 1961; Delaware County, Pennsylvania
- Education: Villanova University (B.S.); University of Pennsylvania (M.S.)
- Occupations: President and CEO, Children's Hospital of Philadelphia
- Board member of: Comcast

Madeline Bell (born c. 1962) is an American nurse and hospital administrator. She is the president and CEO of the Children's Hospital of Philadelphia (CHOP).

== Education ==
Bell is a native of Delaware County, Pennsylvania. She grew up in Broomall, Pennsylvania, and graduated from Marple Newtown High School. Bell graduated from Villanova University with a Bachelor of Science degree in nursing in 1983, and holds an honorary doctorate in human letters from Villanova. She earned a Master of Science degree in Organizational Dynamics from the University of Pennsylvania.

== Personal life ==
Bell is married to CHOP doctor Louis Bell. They have seven adult children.

== Career ==
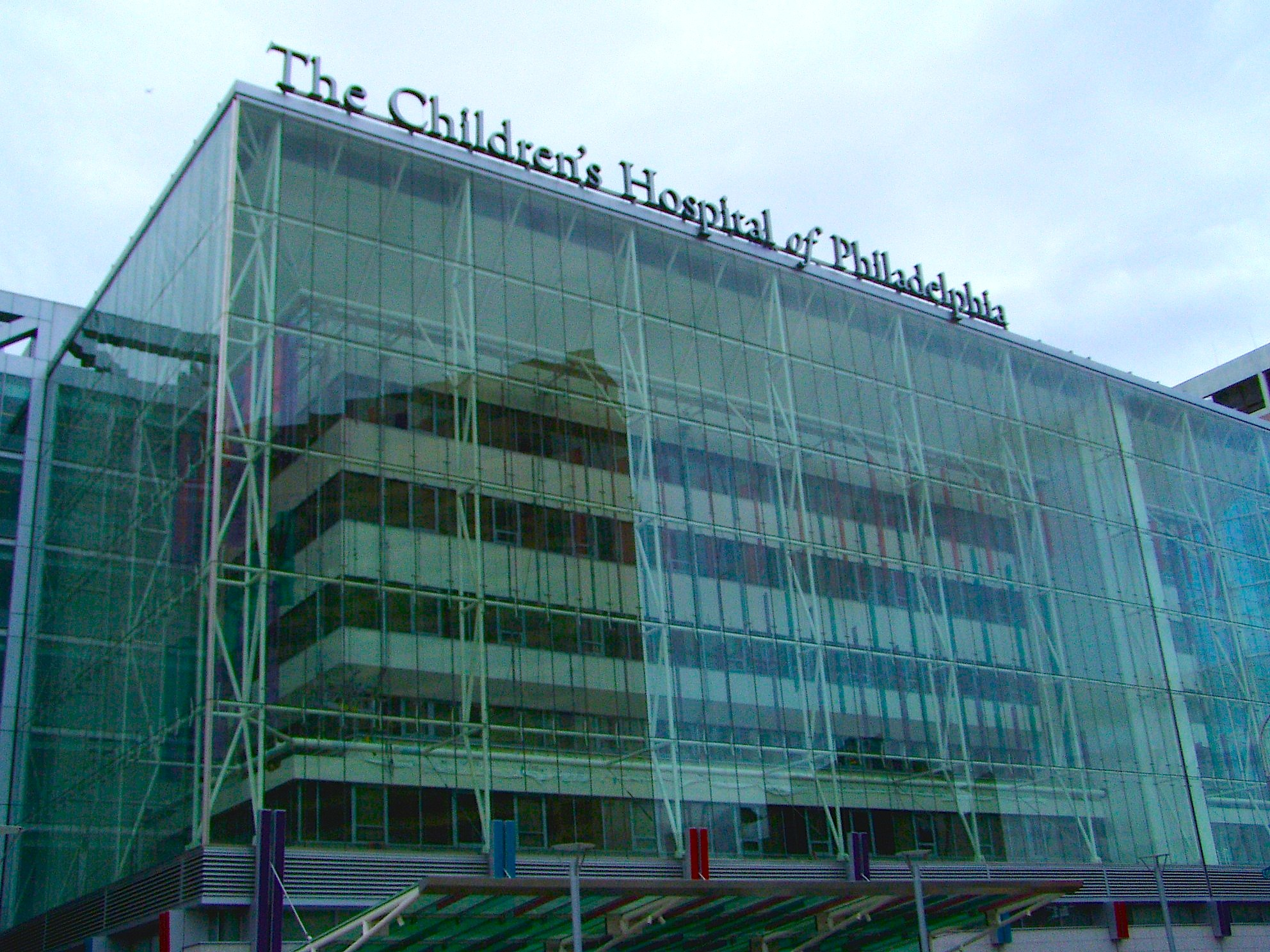
The Children's Hospital of Philadelphia

Bell began her career as a pediatric night nurse at CHOP in 1983. She left CHOP to pursue a career in hospital administration. She returned to CHOP in 1995.

Bell has held the roles of Vice President, Senior Vice President, and Executive Vice President at CHOP. She was Chief Operating Officer at CHOP for eight years. She was named president and CEO of the hospital in 2015.

In 2016, Bell joined Comcast's Board of Directors, and is the second woman to hold this role. She joined the board of directors for the Federal Reserve Bank of Philadelphia in 2018, eventually serving as chair. She is also a fellow of the Philadelphia College of Physicians, and has served on local leadership boards, including The Philadelphia Regional Recharge and Recovery Taskforce formed in 2020 to support economic development in Philadelphia.

According to a Philadelphia Inquirer investigation, Bell's 2021 compensation of $7.7 million made her the country's highest paid children's hospital CEO. Her 2021 pay package exceeded the hospital expenses on charitable care over three years combined. CHOP tied Bell's compensation's to financial metrics, thereby raising legal questions about CHOP's ability to keep its tax exempt non-profit status. The following year, Bell's total pay decreased to $3.7 million.
