= Ronald McDonald House Charities Canada =

Canadian non-profit organization

Ronald McDonald House Charities Canada (RMHCC) is a non-profit organization that provides temporary accommodation for families with seriously ill children who have to travel to access necessary medical care. RMHCC's 33 programs across Canada consist of 16 Ronald McDonald Houses, which provide families with a home near the hospital while their child is receiving treatment, and 17 Ronald McDonald Family Rooms, which provide families with a room within the hospital.

== Locations ==
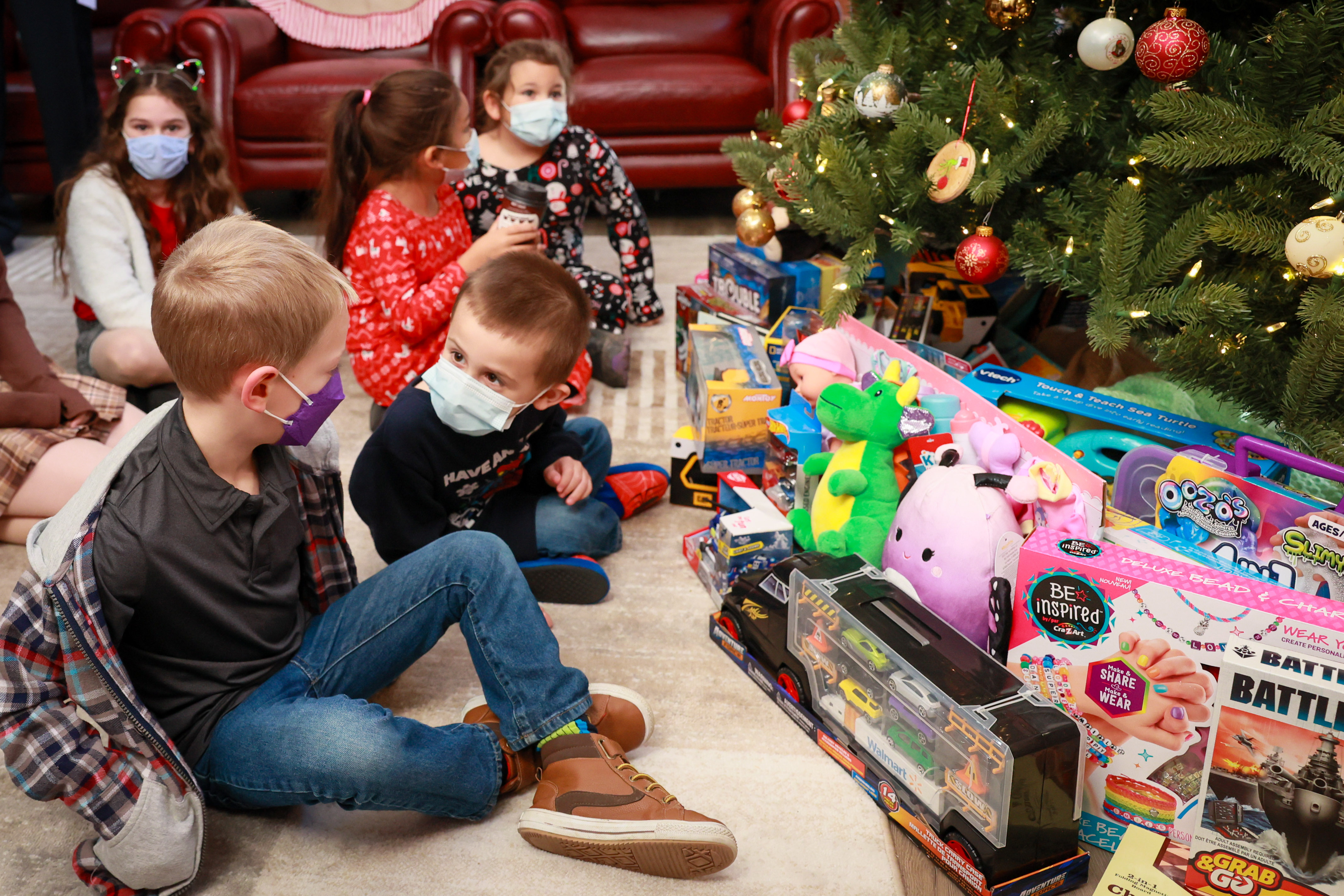
Toys for Tots at the Ottawa Ronald McDonald House in 2022

The RMHCC houses, rooms and care mobiles are located in:

- British Columbia: Vancouver, Surrey
- Alberta: Calgary, Edmonton, Medicine Hat, Red Deer
- Saskatchewan: Saskatoon, Prince Albert
- Manitoba: Winnipeg
- Ontario: Ottawa, Hamilton, London, Windsor, Toronto, Sudbury, Markham, Mississauga, Scarborough
- Quebec: Montreal, Quebec City
- Nova Scotia: Halifax
- New Brunswick: Moncton
- Newfoundland and Labrador: St. John's

== Donations ==
Each Ronald McDonald House is independently operated by its own charitable organization, and is supported by individual and corporate donors. McDonald's restaurants in Canada hold an annual fundraising event called McHappy Day on which a portion of proceeds from all food and beverage items sold goes directly to RMHCC and other local children's charities.

== See also ==
- Ronald McDonald House Charities
- Ronald McDonald House New York
