= Penn Genome Frontiers Institute =

The Penn Genome Frontiers Institute, previously known as the Penn Genomics Institute, was established in January 2001 to provide a focus for all aspects of and participants in the genomics community at University of Pennsylvania, Children's Hospital of Philadelphia (CHOP) and the Wistar Institute.
