= Ronald McDonald House =

U.S.-based nonprofit organization

- Formation: October 15, 1974; 52 years ago Philadelphia, Pennsylvania, U.S.
- Type: Health care, charity, social welfare
- Headquarters: Chicago, Illinois, U.S.
- Location: 7,128 worldwide
- Official language: English
- Key people: Katie Fitzgerald (president and CEO); Alex Dimitrief (chairman of the board)
- Website: ronaldmcdonaldhouse.org

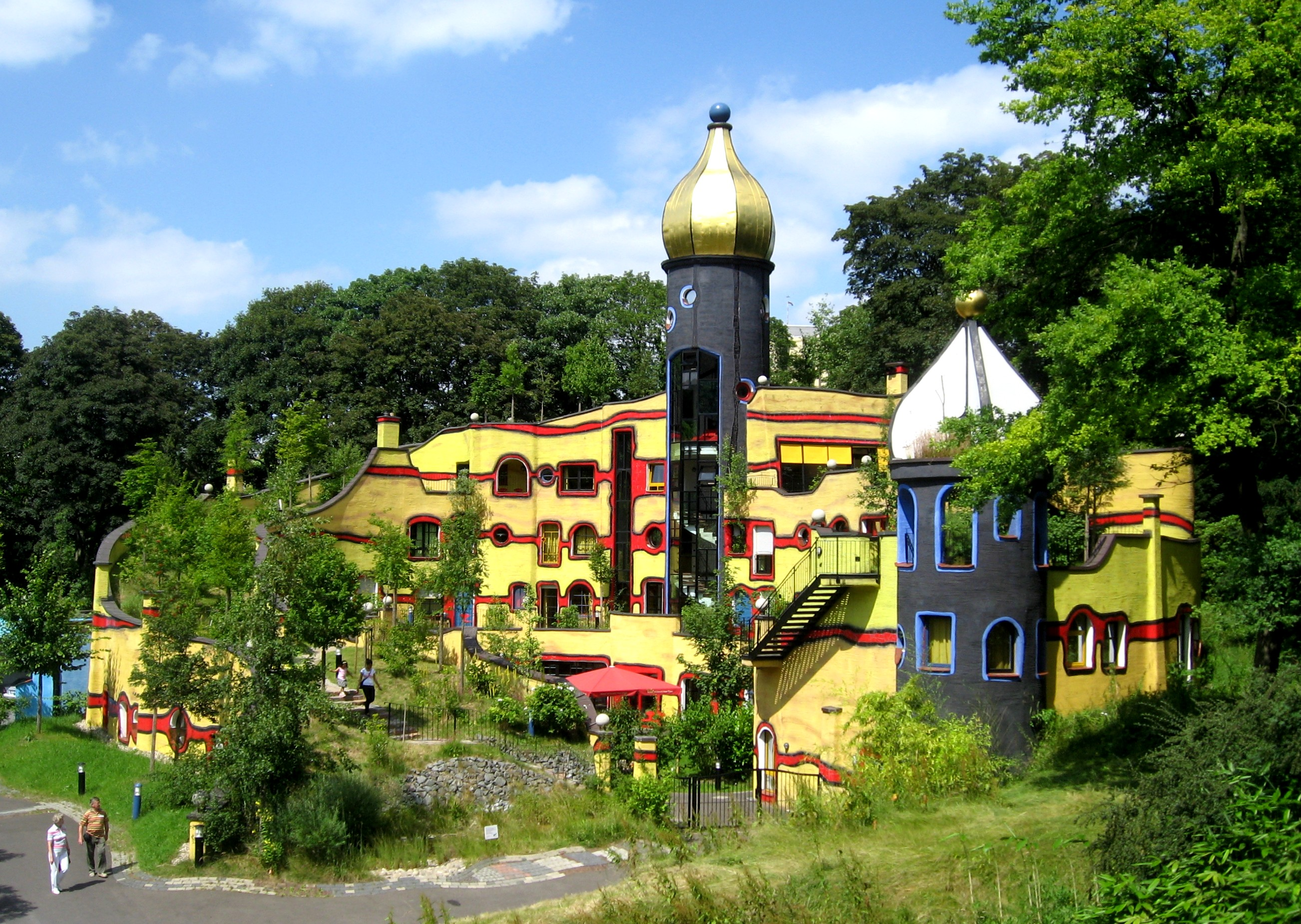
Ronald McDonald House in Essen, Germany, designed by Friedensreich Hundertwasser

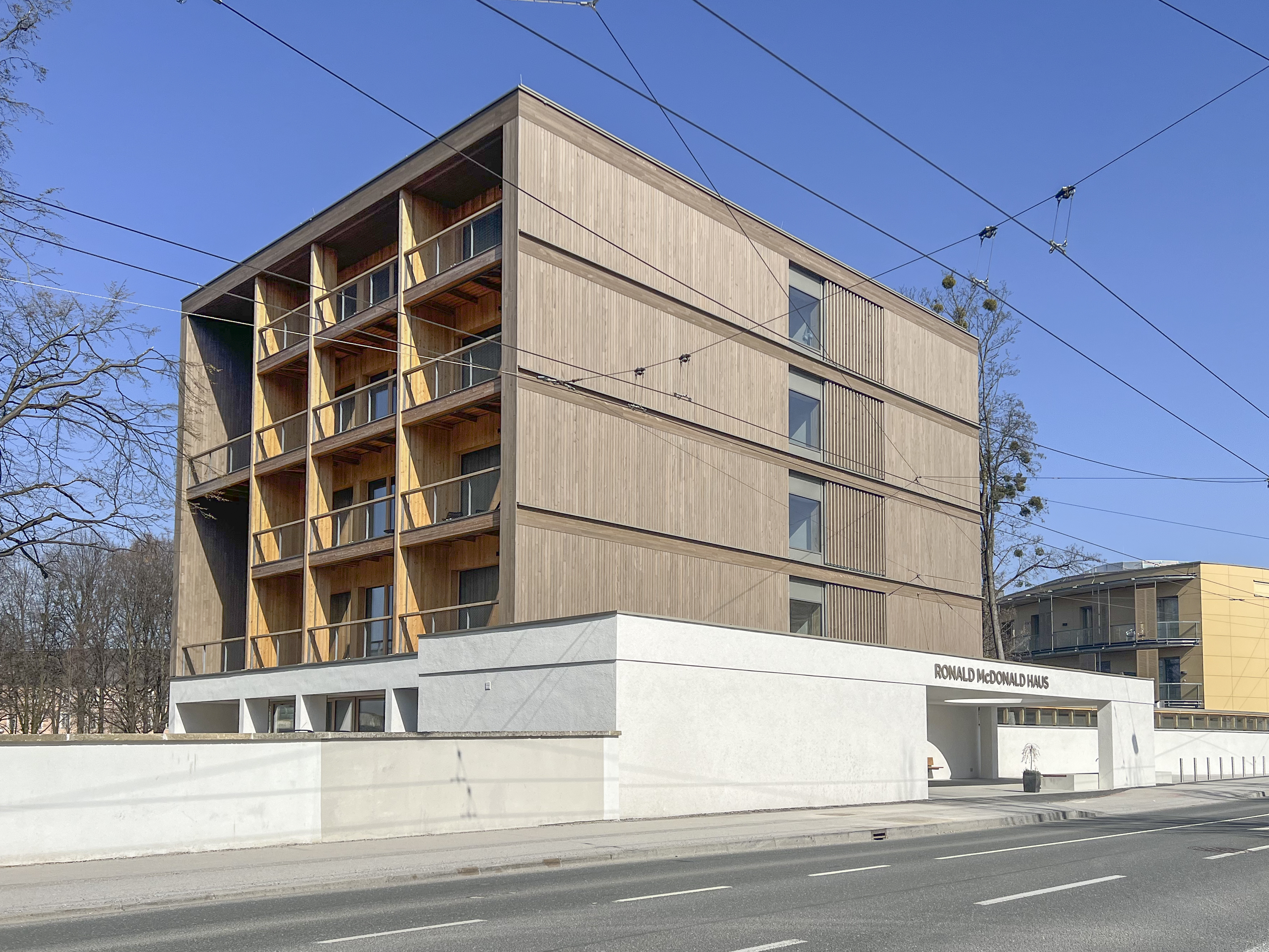
Ronald McDonald House in Salzburg, Austria

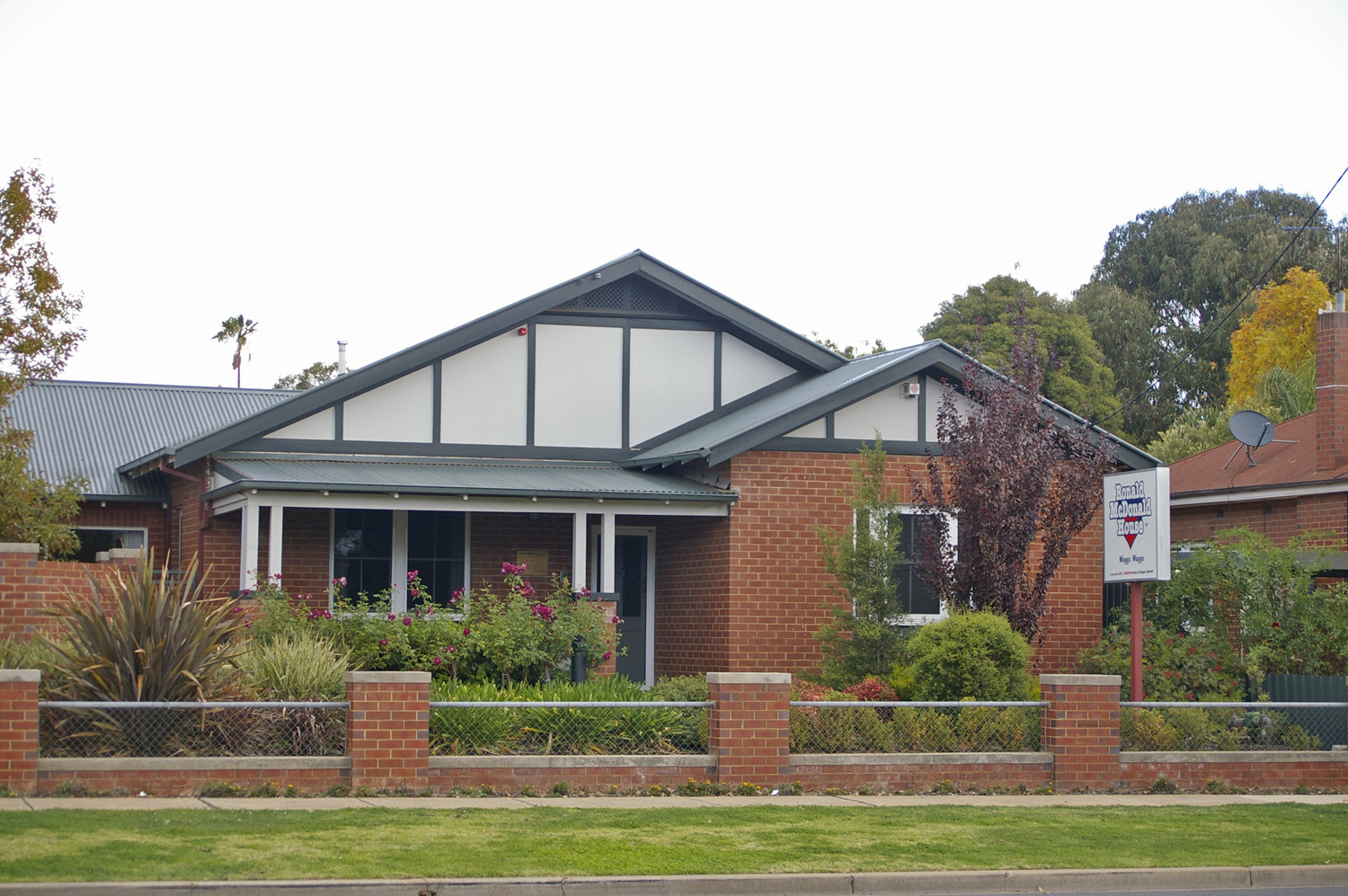
Ronald McDonald House in Wagga Wagga, New South Wales, Australia

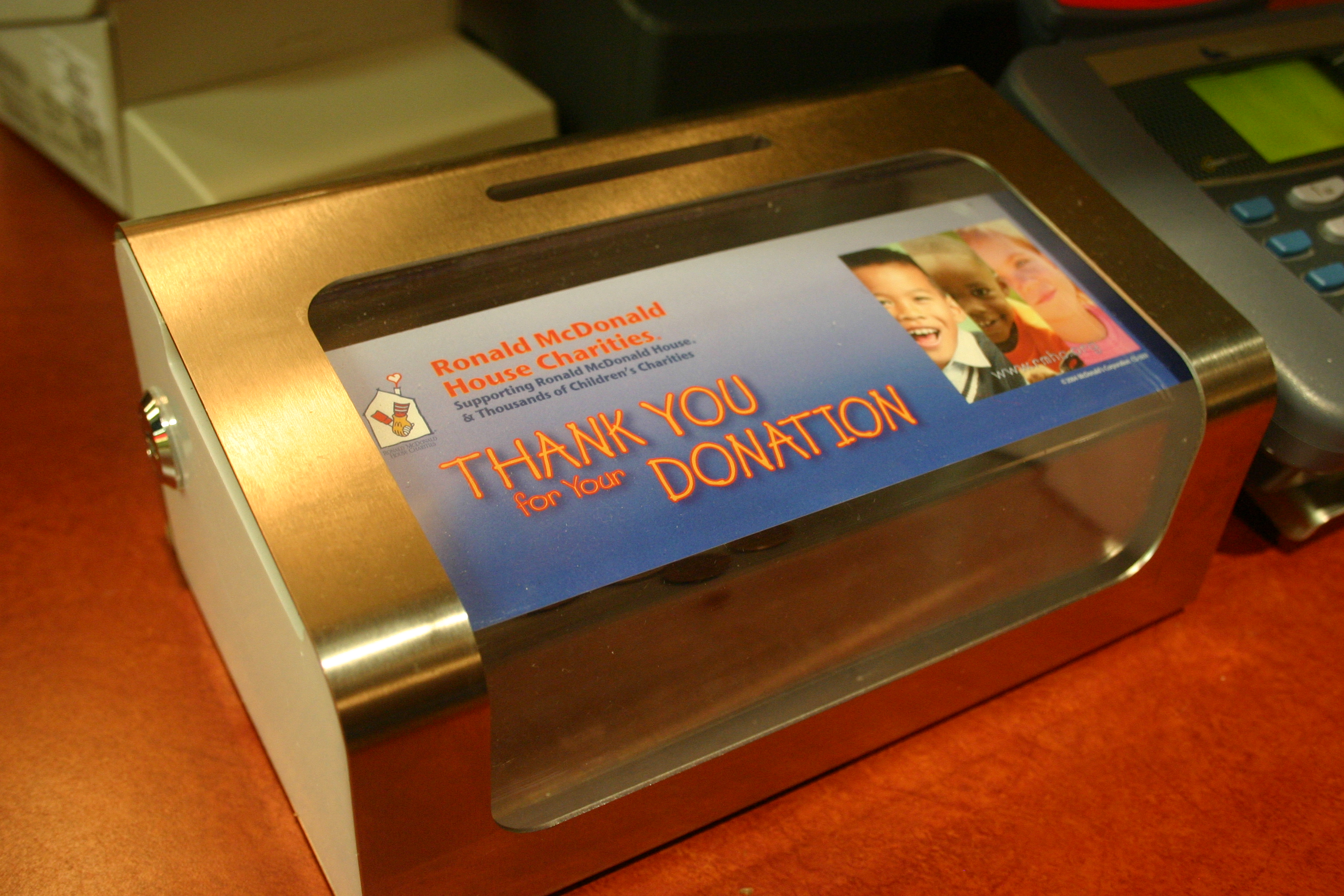
Ronald McDonald House collection canister

Ronald McDonald House is an independent American nonprofit organization that supports families with children who are ill or injured by providing essential services that remove barriers, strengthen families, and promote healing.

Ronald McDonald House operates chapters in 62 countries and regions under three core programs: Ronald McDonald House, Ronald McDonald Family Room and Ronald McDonald Care Mobile.

== Programs ==
The first Ronald McDonald House was opened in Philadelphia in 1974. Jim Murray, general manager of the Philadelphia Eagles, was raising funds for one of his players' (Fred Hill) daughters when he met Children's Hospital of Philadelphia oncologist Dr. Audrey Evans. They partnered with Elkman Advertising, which handled marketing for McDonald's, and the charity took the name of the latter's mascot.

=== Houses ===
In the 2023 annual report, Ronald McDonald House lists 394 Ronald McDonald Houses in 62 countries. House programs accommodate families with hospitalized children, who are being treated at nearby hospitals and medical facilities.

=== Family Rooms ===
There are more than 278 Ronald McDonald Family Rooms in 28 countries. These family rooms are inside of hospitals, so that families can stay by their children.

=== Care Mobiles ===
There are 41 Ronald McDonald Care Mobiles in ten countries. These care mobiles travel throughout select regions of the world and provide health care to families in need.

=== International ===
In 1981, the first Ronald McDonald House outside the United States opened, in Toronto, Ontario. In 1991, the 150th Ronald McDonald House opened, in Paris, France. On July 25, 2005, the 250th location opened in Caracas, Venezuela, but it has since been closed. The first in-hospital Ronald McDonald House in APMEA (Asia Pacific Middle East and Africa) opened at Queen Sirikit National Institute of Child Health, Bangkok, Thailand, on June 7, 2011.

==== Australia ====
The first Ronald McDonald House in Australia was opened in Camperdown, New South Wales, in 1981. The number of Houses has since grown to 18. Each House is attached to a major children's or women's hospital. Each House has an independent board that manages its own day-to-day funding.

Other Ronald McDonald House Australia activities include Family Rooms in fourteen hospitals. Ronald McDonald House Australia also operates Family Retreats that enable families of sick children to take a holiday for a week.

The Charlie Bell Scholarship Program is named after the first Australian Global McDonald's Corporation CEO. The program provides financial assistance in the form of 11 one-off scholarships a year. It assists with expenses related to vocational or tertiary education for children who have been seriously ill.

The Ronald McDonald Care Mobile is a partnership between Ronald McDonald House Australia and Royal Far West. It is based in Orange in regional New South Wales and travels throughout rural and remote New South Wales.

Ronald McDonald House Charity Australia is also the major private donor to cord blood banks in Australia, providing a 10-year A$1 million commitment.

==== Hong Kong ====
The first Ronald McDonald House in Hong Kong was opened in 1996 in Sha Tin.

The second House in Kwun Tong District near to the Hong Kong Children's Hospital.

==== Norway ====
On May 21, 2016, Ronald McDonald Barnefond (Ronald McDonald Children's Fund), along with Stine Sofies Stiftelse, opened the world's first camp and learning center for children. Stine Sofie Stiftelse first joined forces with Ronald McDonald Barnefond in 2015. The initial purpose was to fix houses where children of abuse and their families could stay for a day free of charge.

=== Pop Tab Program ===
The Ronald McDonald House Pop Tab Collection Program was established to allow individuals and businesses to collect soda pop tabs from aluminum cans and donate them to their local Ronald McDonald House chapter or Ronald McDonald's House. Though each program differs, for the most part, Ronald McDonald House chapters use the money received from recycling the tabs to help offset operational expenses or to sponsor or support programs. Not all Houses participate in the Pop Tab Program. Collected pop tabs are used by Ronald McDonald House to fund their work.

The Alpha Delta Pi sorority partners with Ronald McDonald House to promote and participate in the Pop Tab Program.

== Relationship with McDonald's ==
The Ronald McDonald House has a program to help support the house through the donation of money from each happy meal purchased at McDonalds. With the purchase of each happy meal two cents is donated to the charity. In 2021 more than $168 million was donated to the Ronald McDonald House through the donations from McDonalds.

Ronald McDonald House has received criticism regarding the relationship between Ronald McDonald House Charities and McDonald's corporate marketing, particularly in the context of debates over childhood obesity and animal welfare. In 2013, food-industry critic and lawyer Michele Simon suggested that the charity's association with McDonald's could help improve the company's public image while promoting its brand to families. Anne Markwardt of Foodwatch similarly questioned the extent of McDonald's direct financial contribution to the charity.

In 2013, Corporate Accountability International estimated that McDonald's contributed approximately 5% of Ronald McDonald House funding, while approximately 30% came from McDonald's customers' donations.

McDonald's and Ronald McDonald House Charities disputed aspects of these criticisms, including claims regarding the company's financial support and the relationship between the charity and McDonald's marketing.

== Awards ==
Worth magazine named Ronald McDonald House Charity one of "America's 100 Best Charities" in 2001 and 2002.

The U.S. Green Building Council awarded Ronald McDonald House Charities of Austin and Central Texas (Ronald McDonald House-ACT) with Leadership in Energy and Environmental Design (LEED) Platinum certification.

== See also ==
- Fisher House Foundation, a similar charity for military families
- Fred Hill
- McHappy Day
- Jim Murray
- Patient hotel
- Ronald McDonald House New York
- Ronald McDonald House Canada
