= Ronald McDonald House New York =

American children's charity

- Founded: 1979
- Type: Children's 501(c)(3) charity
- Location(s): 405 East 73rd Street (bet. First Avenue and York Avenue), Upper East Side, Manhattan, New York City, U.S.
- Coordinates: 40.768173°N 73.95463°W
- Key people: Lucretia Gilbert, MA, President & CEO (2026)
- Website: www.rmh-newyork.org

Ronald McDonald House New York (RMH-NY) is a children's 501(c)(3) charity located at 405 East 73rd Street (between First Avenue and York Avenue), on the Upper East Side in Manhattan in New York City. It provides temporary accommodation for the families of children ages 0–26 undergoing treatment for pediatric cancer, and is the only facility in New York City to provide post-transplant suites outside of a hospital.

== History ==
The House was officially incorporated in 1979 as 26-room facility. It has now grown to be a 95-room, 11-story, 79,000-square-foot (7,300 m^{2}) red brick building that was built in 1989 by the Spector Group. A "Fred Lebow Room" has been dedicated at the House.

== Operations ==
The House has provided support to over 35,000 families from over 70 countries in its 95 suites. RMH-NY provides not only a place for families to stay but many amenities, programs and support services, such as meals, transportation, tutoring and wellness programs. Additionally, an extensive lineup of activities and events for guests of all ages and backgrounds are offered every day. After long days of treatment, these programs help give children and their families a break and much-needed relief.

As of 2026, the President & Chief Executive Officer is Lucretia Gilbert.

The House accepts and relies upon thousands of volunteers, as well as canine volunteers, in addition to its full-time staff.

== See also ==
- Ronald McDonald House Charities (United States)
- Ronald McDonald House Charities Canada
