= Children's Hospital of Philadelphia =

Hospital in Pennsylvania, U.S.

The Children's Hospital of Philadelphia

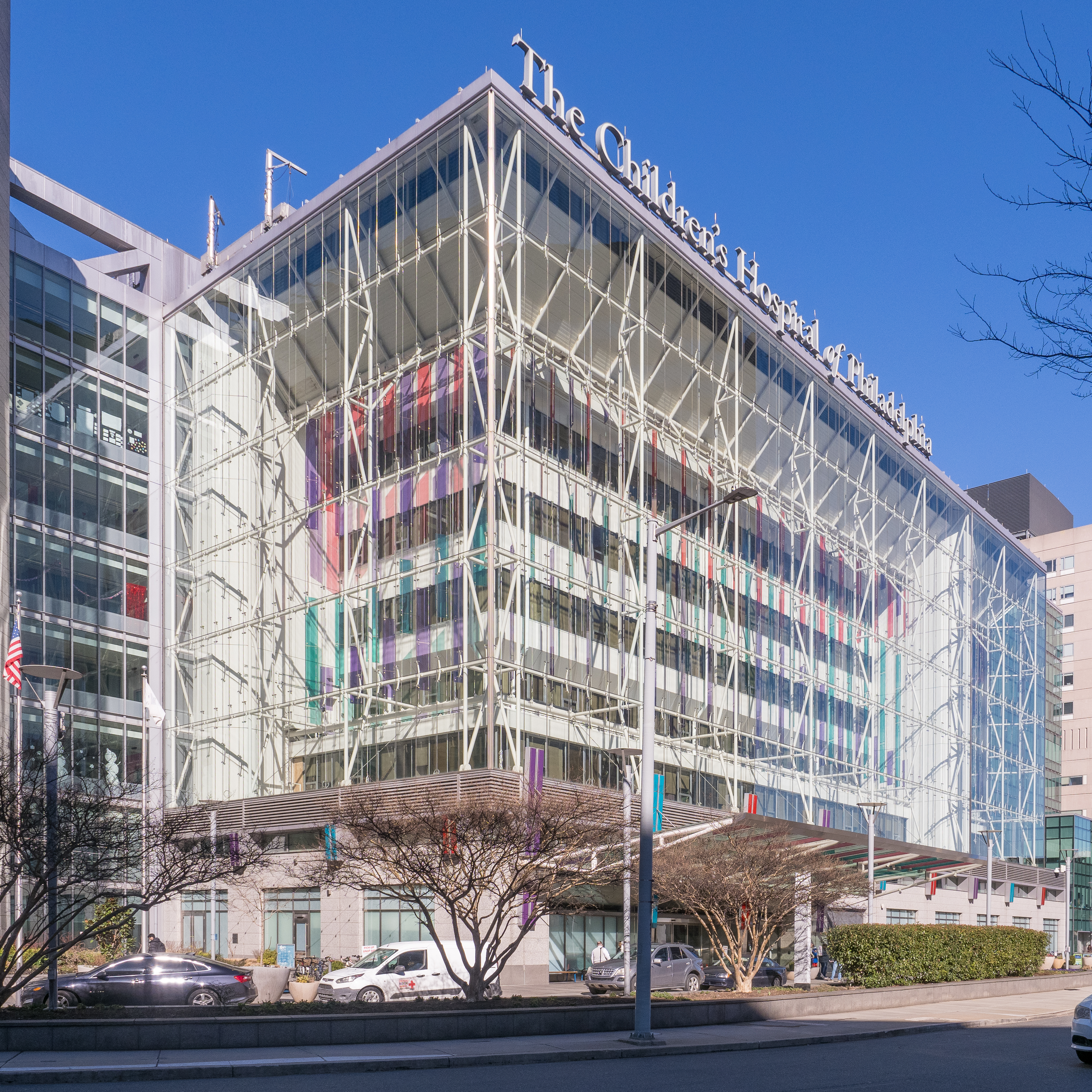
- The main building of the main campus of the Children's Hospital of Philadelphia in Philadelphia

Geography
- Location: 3401 Civic Center Boulevard; Philadelphia, Pennsylvania, U.S., Philadelphia metropolitan area
- Coordinates: 39.948°N 75.194°W

Organisation
- Type: Children's teaching hospital
- Affiliated university: Perelman School of Medicine at the University of Pennsylvania

Services
- Emergency department: Level I Pediatric Trauma Center
- Beds: 594

Helipads
- Helipad: FAA LID: 9PN2
Number	Length		Surface
Number	ft	m	Surface
H1	52 x 50	16 × 15	Mats
H2	50 x 50	15 × 15	asphalt/concrete

History
- Founded: First hospital: 1855; Second hospital: 1866; Third hospital: 1916; Fourth hospital: 1974

Links
- Website: www.chop.edu Philadelphia, PA
- Other links: Madeline Bell

The Children's Hospital of Philadelphia (CHOP (Note: Pronounced as the word "chop" (/tʃɒp/))) is a children's hospital in Philadelphia, Pennsylvania. Its primary campus is located in the University City neighborhood of West Philadelphia, next to the University of Pennsylvania. The hospital has 692 beds and more than 1.6 million outpatient and inpatient visits annually. It is one of the world's largest and oldest children's hospitals and was the first hospital in the United States dedicated to the healthcare of children.

CHOP has been ranked among the best ten children's hospitals in the United States by U.S. News & World Report since 2009. As of 2024, it was ranked number one in the nation by U.S. News & World Report for two out of eleven specialties. The hospital treats infants, children, teens, and young adults aged 0–21.

The hospital also treats adults who would benefit from advanced pediatric care. Most of its physicians serve in the pediatrics and other specialty departments of the Perelman School of Medicine.

== History ==
=== First location 1855–1866 ===
In 1855, Philadelphia had a population of about 460,000, and recorded 10,507 deaths. Leading causes of death were smallpox, typhoid, and scarlet fever. In the worst month of 1855, 300 children under 12 years old died, primarily of infectious diseases. A Philadelphia physician, Dr. Francis West Lewis, inspired by a visit to the new Great Ormond Street Hospital for Sick Children in London (founded 1852), enlisted Drs. T. Hewson Bache and R. A. F. Penrose Sr. to found the first children's hospital in North America.

On November 23, 1855, the following small advertisement appeared in the Philadelphia Public Ledger:

The Children's Hospital—located on Blight Street, running from Pine to Lombard, below Broad, is now open for the reception of Patients. Children suffering from Acute Diseases and Accidents will be received free of charge. A dispensary, for sick children, is also attached to the Hospital and will be open at the same place every day, (Sundays excepted from 11 to 12 o'clock, when advice and medicine will be given free of charge.)

The first location of the original Children's Hospital was a small building on Blight Street (now Watts St). The hospital consisted of 12 beds and a dispensary. That year they recorded 67 inpatient admissions and 306 outpatient visits.

=== Second location 1866–1916 ===
Children's Hospital was relocated to 22nd Street between Locust and Walnut Sts after the American Civil War. This hospital consisted of 35 beds and a dispensary. The second hospital was the site of the first surgery at CHOP, which was first performed in 1870. In addition, the first resident physician at CHOP was appointed in 1873, and formal medical teaching in medical and surgical clinics began in 1877.

Early on in CHOP's history, a long-term care ("convalescent") facility was opened as a county branch near Overbrook. In 1899, the County Branch convalescent facility was closed, and the program and patients were transferred to the Seashore House near Atlantic City, New Jersey. CHOP later underwent an expansion, and capacity was increased to 94 beds by 1892.

- A nursing school, the Ingersoll Training School, was opened in 1894.
- In 1900, the Catherwood Milk Laboratory was established.
- In 1914, the first department for the Prevention of Disease in the nation was established.

=== Third location 1916–1974 ===
Construction adjacent to the second hospital began in 1913, and the first unit was opened in 1916, extending toward 18th and Bainbridge Streets.

In 1919, the hospital became affiliated with the University of Pennsylvania School of Medicine. The affiliation became steadily closer over the next 17 years, with the Children's Hospital becoming identical to the pediatric department of the school of medicine, with most of the attending physicians appointed jointly to both institutions.

- In 1925, the hospital became affiliated with the Philadelphia Child Guidance Clinic.
- The whooping cough (pertussis) vaccine was first developed.
- The first formal allocation of funds to research was recorded in 1937.
- The first closed incubator for newborns was used.
- The nursing school was disbanded in 1945 and converted into an affiliate training center.
- A six-story research building next to the hospital was dedicated in 1954.
- In 1962, under Dr. C. Everett Koop (later to be Surgeon General), the first neonatal intensive care unit (NICU) in the nation was opened, along with a new neonatal surgical unit.
- In 1965, the first home care program for children was established.
- A Clinical Research Center under the auspices of the National Institutes of Health was opened in 1965.

In 1967, after years of lobbying hospital physicians and anesthesiologists, Dr. John Downes finally opened up a pediatric intensive care unit (PICU) at CHOP, the first of its kind in the United States. Downes was inspired by pediatric and adult intensive care units in Europe and wanted to open a state-of-the-art unit in Philadelphia to care for the sickest of children. Before the creation of a PICU at CHOP, children who required advanced care were often cared for on the surgery wards and recovery rooms. Most of these children were cared for by anesthesiologists in the recovery room.

=== Fourth location 1974–2022 ===
Construction of the new hospital at a new site on the west side of the Schuylkill River at 34th Street and Civic Center Boulevard, adjacent to the campus of the University of Pennsylvania, began in 1969, and the first building was opened in 1974. This present Children's Hospital complex occupies part of the site of the old Philadelphia General Hospital and Blockley Almshouse.

A helicopter transport system for critically ill and injured children was inaugurated in 1973.

Milestones and advances in pediatric care pioneered at CHOP include the first formal medical training in pediatrics, techniques for the correction of congenital heart malformations, incubators for newborn intensive care, home ventilator care, and vaccine development.

In October 2006, Children's Hospital of Philadelphia's trauma center was one of the receiving hospitals' for victims of the West Nickel Mines School shooting, treating a few of the pediatric victims from the shooting who were medevaced to the hospital.

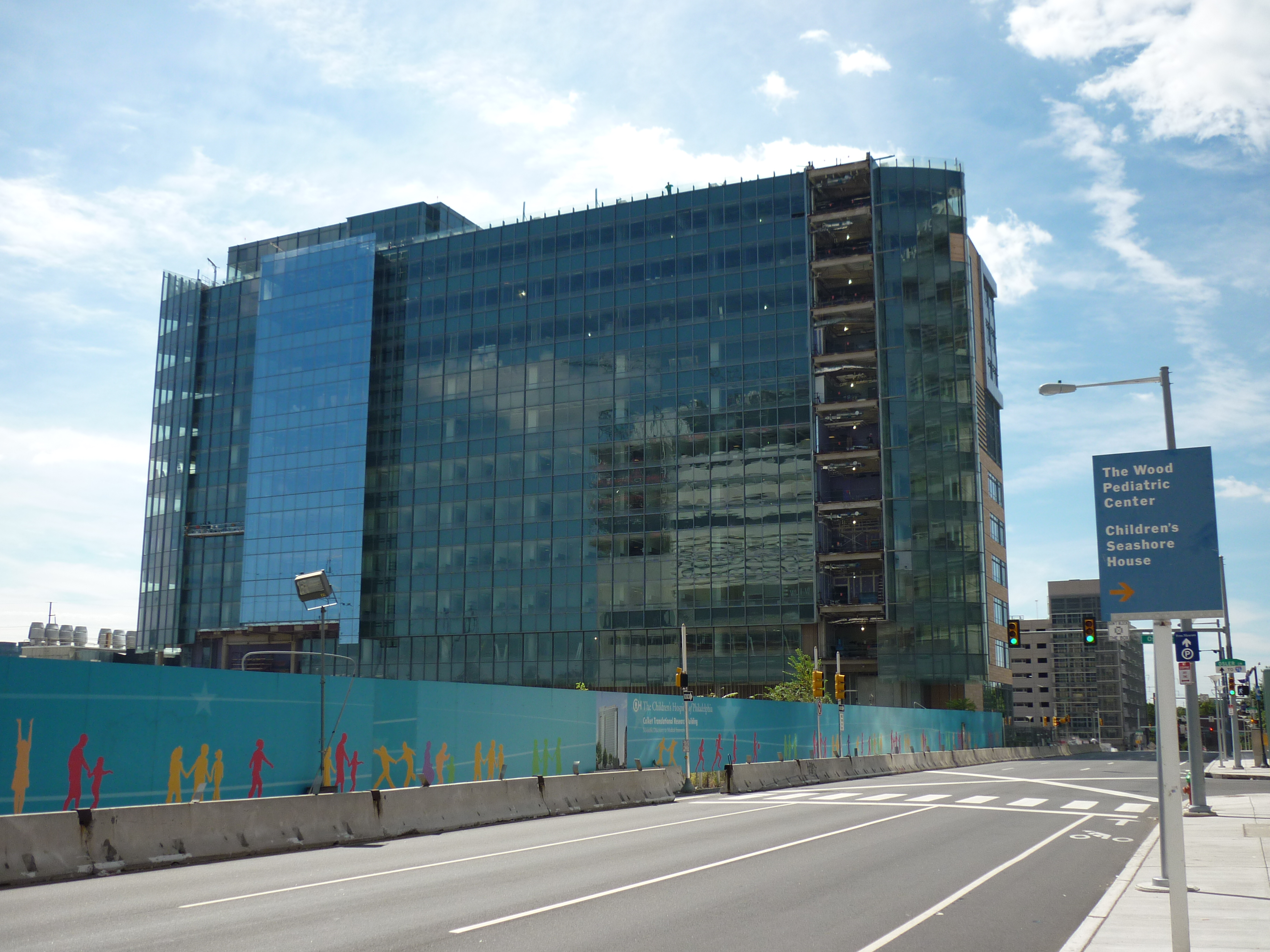
Colket Translational Research Building, under construction in 2009

The Children's Hospital of Philadelphia is in Philadelphia's University City neighborhood, and since 2001 has been undergoing a $1.5 billion expansion that has doubled the hospital's size, while also building more than one million sq ft (93,000 m^{2}) of new research and outpatient facilities on a large, eight-acre (3.2 ha) site south of the main hospital on Civic Center Boulevard. The South Campus expansion includes the eleven-story Colket Translational Research Building, which provides lab space for the Center for Childhood Cancer Research and the Center for Cellular and Molecular Therapeutics. The new South Campus also includes an underground parking garage and an ambulatory care building with outpatient services.

This South Campus expansion adjoins the University of Pennsylvania Health System's construction of the Perelman Center for Advanced Medicine and Roberts Proton Therapy Center.

On July 1, 2015, Madeline Bell, previously CHOP's president and chief operating officer, became president and chief executive officer. She succeeded Steven M. Altschuler, MD, who retired after 15 years as CEO. The board of trustees of Children's Hospital made the announcement on May 14.

In May 2020 amidst the 2020 COVID-19 pandemic CHOP started offering virtual pediatric urgent care visits to all children aged 0–21 throughout Pennsylvania, New Jersey, New York, and Delaware regardless of if the child was a patient at the hospital or not.

=== Area expansion since 2022 ===
In January 2022, CHOP opened a new inpatient hospital on its King of Prussia campus, followed by a new Center for Advanced Behavioral Healthcare in West Philadelphia in October 2022 and a Behavioral Health and Crisis Center in spring 2024. The hospital also opened new satellite locations in New Brunswick and Cape May, among others.

As of 2025, CHOP plans to build a new 24-story tower next to its main hospital by 2028. The tower is planned to have 1.3 million square feet and 700 private patient rooms. The building is financed with the help of a $125 million gift from Brian L. Roberts. CHOP also plans a renovation of its main hospital with help from the same gift.

== Facilities ==
CHOP has 692 beds, almost 40 percent of which are allocated to neonatal, cardiac, and pediatric intensive care. In Fiscal Year 2024, the hospital reported 34,829 hospital admissions and 1.63 million outpatient visits.

=== Expansion plans ===
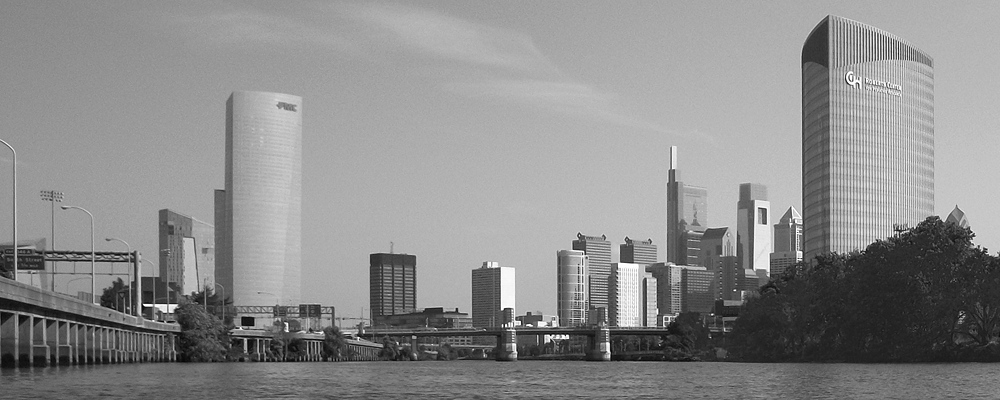
The Roberts Center for Pediatric Research is at the right.

The hospital has developed an expansion plan that includes four buildings along Schuylkill Avenue, on the east side of the Schuylkill River. The first building, a 375-foot-tall (114 m) tower called the Roberts Center for Pediatric Research, or the CHOP Research Tower, was built between 2015 and 2017 on the 700 block of Schuylkill Avenue, with an address of 2716 South Street. A second building, the Morgan Center for Research and Innovation is under construction as of 2025. It will be a 17-story, 350,000-square-foot facility to provide more laboratory research capacity for molecular and biomedical studies.

=== Children's Seashore House ===
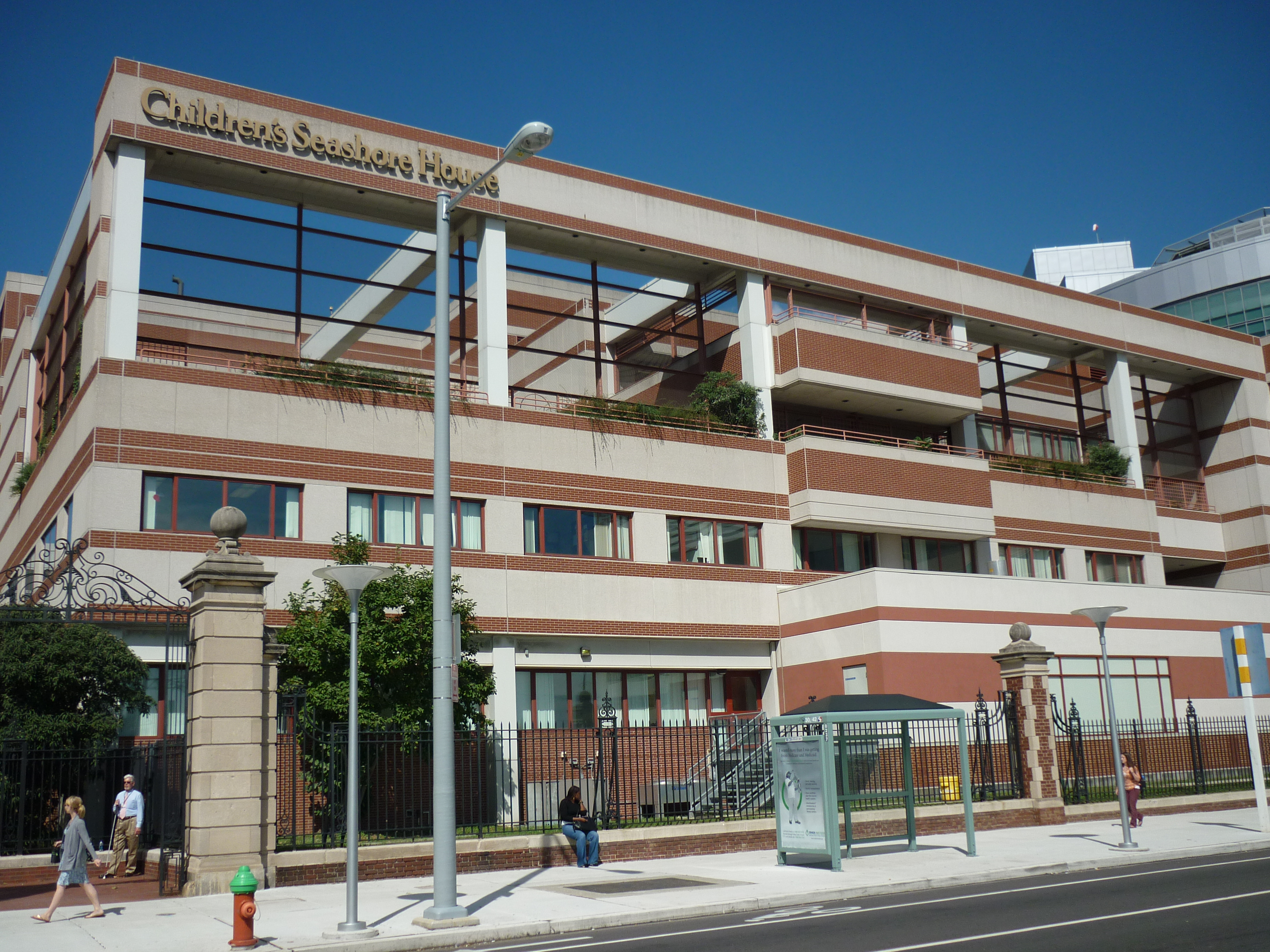
Children's Seashore House, current location

Children's Seashore House was founded in 1872 near Atlantic City, New Jersey, as a place for children to receive rehabilitation treatment. The hospital moved to its current location next to CHOP in 1990, and was acquired by CHOP in 1998, whereas of which the hospital has 45 beds. It currently provides inpatient and outpatient care for children with developmental disabilities and chronic illnesses.

=== Buerger Center for Advanced Pediatric Care ===
In 2015, the Buerger Center for Advanced Pediatric Care opened and moved most outpatient services into the building. The addition is a 12-story, 700,000-square-foot (65,000 m^{2}) building with a five-story, 1500-space underground parking garage directly attached. Composed of stacked forms and a selection of primary colors, the twelve-story building and six-story wing offer an interactive setting for treatment.

=== Middleman Family Pavilion ===
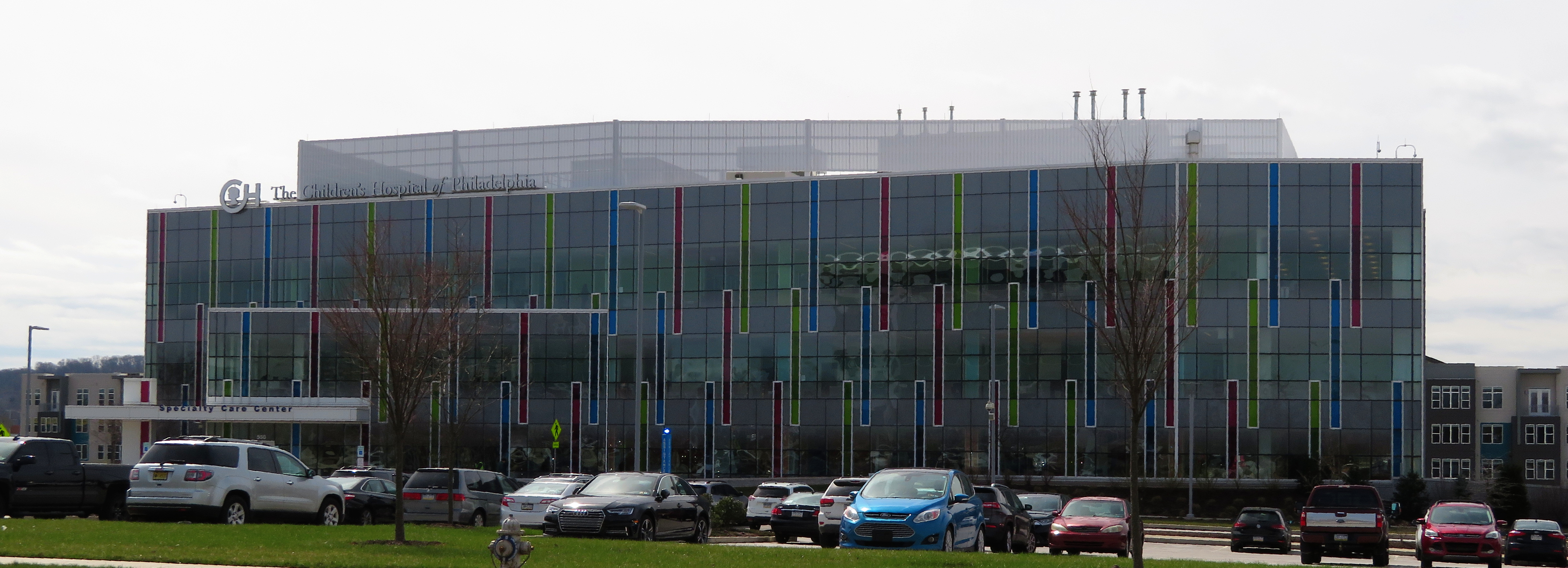
The specialty care outpatient center at the King of Prussia campus, that has since been expanded to the now Middleman Family Pavillion, in CHOP's second hospital.

In June 2018, CHOP announced their plans to build a second children's hospital campus in King of Prussia, Pennsylvania; the hospital, with an expected cost $298 million and consisting of seven floors and 250,000 square feet (23,000 m^{2}), would have a capacity of 52 beds, with a potential expansion to 108 beds. In September 2019, Swedish construction firm Skanska broke ground on the new building. The new hospital is built adjacent to CHOP's specialty care and outpatient surgery center. In the wake of the 2020 COVID-19 pandemic, CHOP officials released that they were considering adding beds to the shell space to total 108 beds. The hospital opened on January 26, 2022.

On November 8, 2021, it was announced that CHOP had received a large donation from local businessman Stanley Middleman, provoking CHOP to name the new King of Prussia campus The Middleman Family Pavilion.

The hospital has 52 total beds with shell space reserved for future expansion.

- 16 pediatric intensive care unit beds
- 36 medical surgical unit beds
- pediatric emergency department

=== Princeton Medical Center ===
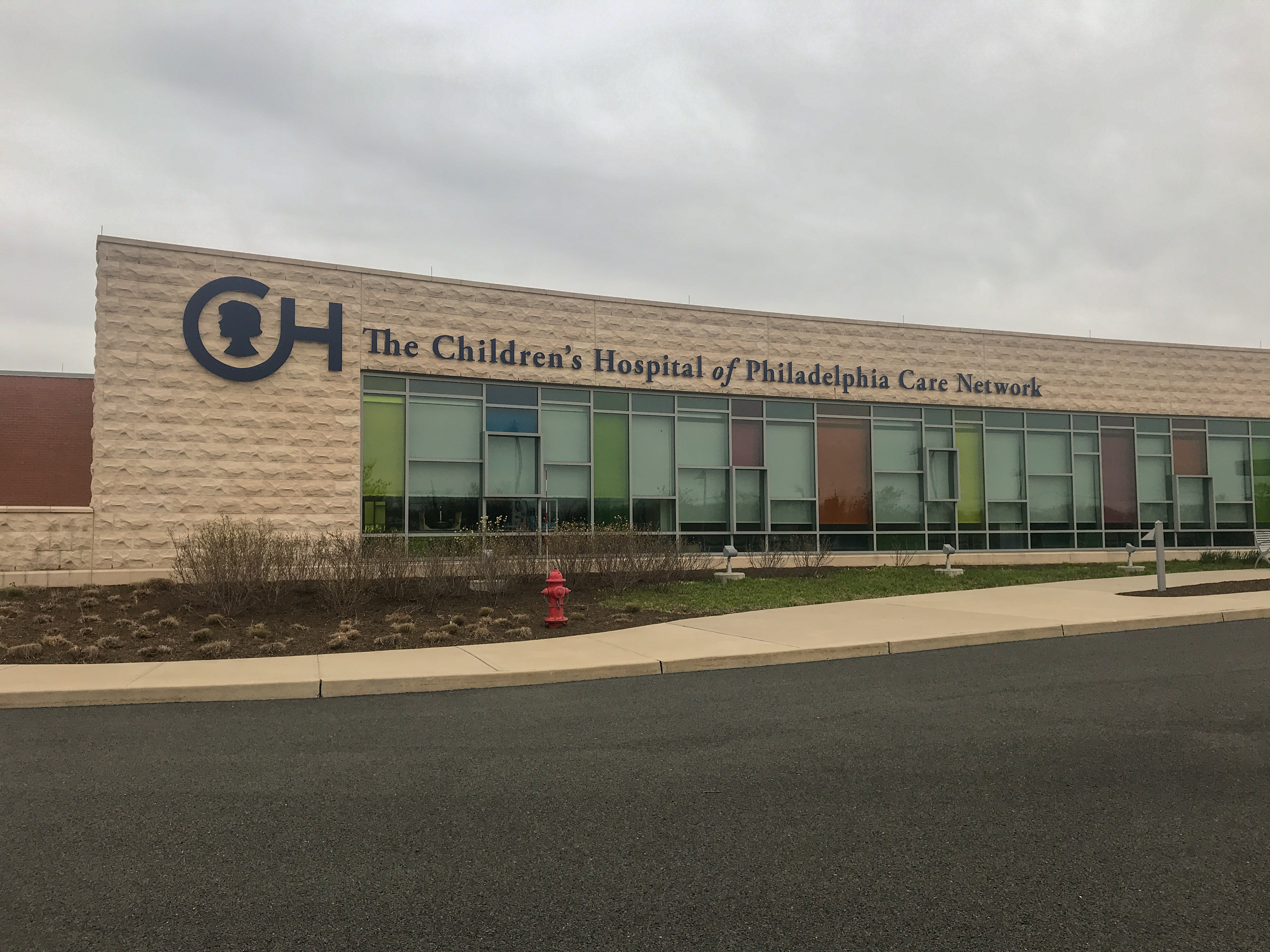
The CHOP specialty center at Penn Medicine Princeton Medical Center

Pediatric care to the Penn Medicine Princeton Medical Center (PMC) is provided by doctors from the Children's Hospital of Philadelphia on PMC's inpatient pediatric wards, pediatric emergency department, and pediatric specialty care center. Adjacent to the medical center is the Children's Hospital of Philadelphia Specialty Center that treats infants, children, adolescents, and young adults up to the age of 21.

=== Saint Peter's University Hospital ===
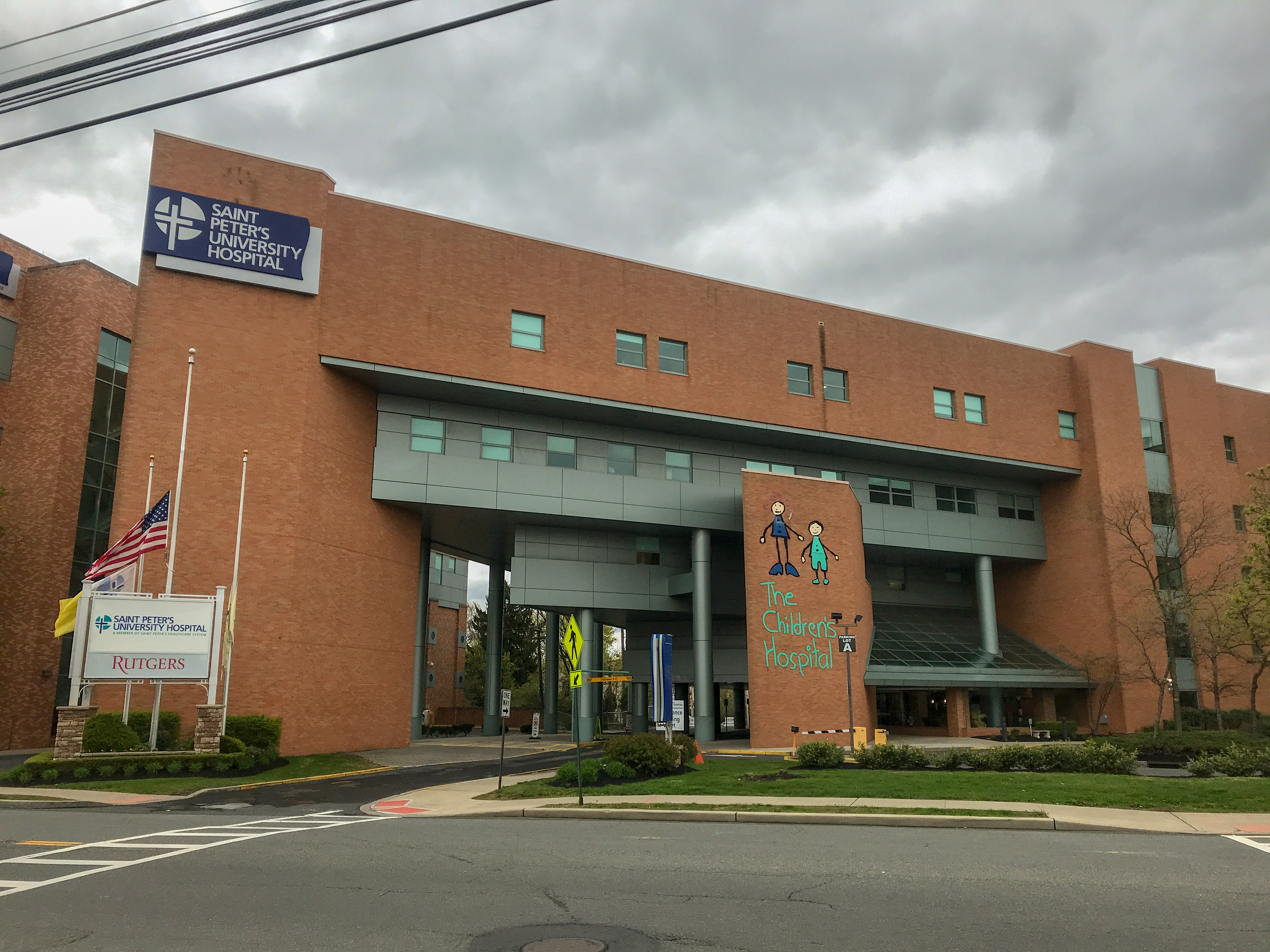
The children's pavilion of Saint Peters University Hospital

In addition to all of their outpatient centers, hospitals and primary care offices, CHOP also maintains an affiliation with the New Jersey–based Saint Peter's University Hospital. All pediatric cardiac care at The Children's Hospital at Saint Peters is conducted from physicians affiliated with CHOP and complex cases are usually transferred to the hospital.

== About ==
=== Services ===
CHOP has an Adolescent & Young Adult Oncology Program for adolescents and young adults up to 30 to have treatment for their cancers.

=== Seacrest Studios ===
Seacrest Studios (formerly known as The Voice) at Children's Hospital of Philadelphia is a closed-circuit radio station and multimedia center. The studio, located in the main lobby, provides young patients within The Children's Hospital of Philadelphia community with an outlet to engage in activities related to radio, TV and new media, ranging from broadcasting like a disc jockey and playing their favorite songs to watching live artists perform and interviewing celebrities.

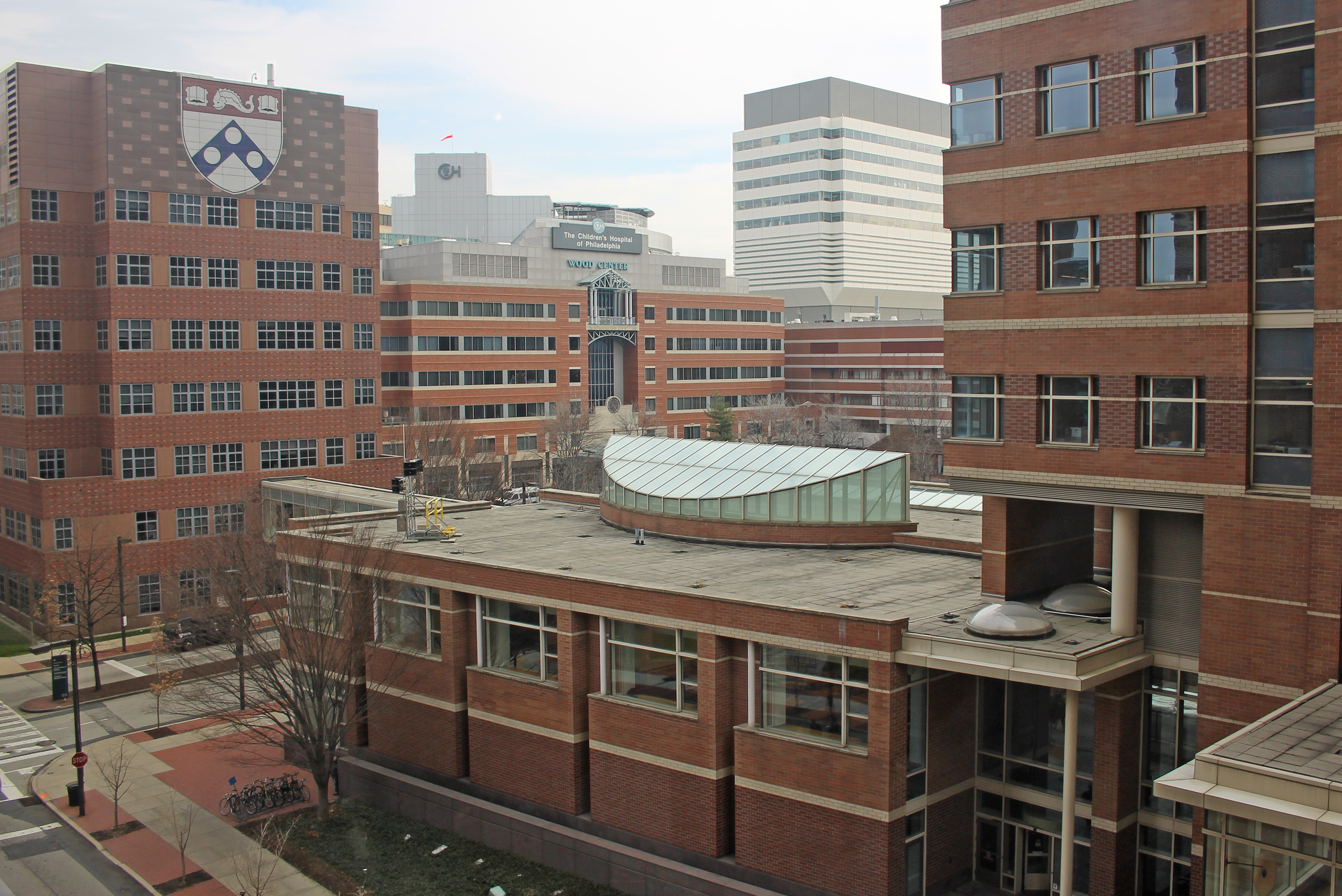
Research and medical facilities of the University of Pennsylvania School of Medicine and the Children's Hospital of Philadelphia

The mission of Children's Hospital of Philadelphia's Media Programs and Seacrest Studios is building broadcast media centers, named Seacrest Studios, within the hospital to help in the healing process. Patients have access to radio, television and new media. Seacrest Studios opened in July 2011 and is the second media center to open after the completion of the first center November 2010 at Children's Healthcare of Atlanta in Georgia. Seacrest chose Children's Hospital of Philadelphia because it is a center of pediatric research and is focused on developing programs which enrich each patient's emotional well-being.

Seacrest Studios gives children the opportunity to conduct interviews with celebrities and watch live performances. The following Celebrities were guests of Seacrest Studios: Selena Gomez (who was also named as ambassador to the foundation in April 2012), CeeLo Green, Carrie Underwood, The Fray, Adam Levine, 5 Seconds of Summer, Taylor Swift, Julianne Hough, Jason Derulo, the cast of The Maze Runner, Hot Chelle Rae, Philadelphia Mayor Michael Nutter, Florida Georgia Line, R5, Austin Mahone and Rixton.

=== Ronald McDonald House ===
The Philadelphia Ronald McDonald House was the first of the Ronald McDonald House Charities and now stands at 39th and Chestnut Streets in West Philadelphia. The House opened with the help of Philadelphia Eagles manager Jimmy Murray and The Children's Hospital of Philadelphia's Pediatric Oncologists Dr. Audrey Evans and Dr. Milton 'Mickey' Donaldson. In the early 1970s, Evans and Donaldson saw families spending night after night in the hospital while their children received medical care. She knew there had to be a better way and envisioned a house where families could stay. At the same time, the Philadelphia Eagles were fundraising in support of player Fred Hill's daughter, Kim, who was battling leukemia. In 2006, the first Ronald McDonald Family Room was opened at The Children's Hospital of Philadelphia in the Oncology Unit.

=== Research ===
In addition to its clinical facilities and programs, CHOP supports multiple research programs and dedicated core facilities. Its first laboratory opened in 1922, and CHOP scientists' contributions include a gene therapy for Leber congenital amaurosis (Luxturna), antiviral vaccines like the aforementioned pertussis vaccine, and a new model for delivering gene therapy treatments for blood disorders. CHOP has research groups working on childhood cancer, autism, mitochondrial disorders, and many other diseases and conditions, and keeps expanding to include new laboratories and centers (like the Center for Craniofacial Innovation, opened in 2022 with Eric Liao as the director).

== Awards ==
The Children's Hospital of Philadelphia has consistently been ranked among the best hospitals for children by U.S. News & World Report. A detailed ranking of pediatric facilities in the United States is printed in the publication's first stand-alone "America's Best Children's Hospitals" issue.

In 2020, Children's Hospital of Philadelphia was ranked No. 2 nationwide and No. 1 in Pennsylvania in the U.S. News & World Report: Best Children's Hospital Ratings.

In 2021 the hospital was ranked as the No. 2 best children's hospital in the United States by U.S. News & World Report on the publications' honor roll list.

2024–2025 U.S. News & World Report Rankings for Children's Hospital of Philadelphia
Specialty	Rank (In the U.S.)	Score (Out of 100)
Neonatology	4	89.9
Pediatric Cancer	3	95.6
Pediatric Cardiology & Heart Surgery	18	75.9
Pediatric Diabetes & Endocrinology	1	100.0
Pediatric Gastroenterology & GI Surgery	3	98.7
Pediatric Nephrology	6	95.5
Pediatric Neurology & Neurosurgery	4	97.5
Pediatric Orthopedics	1	100.0
Pediatric Pulmonology & Lung Surgery	3	96.2
Pediatric Urology	3	90.8

== See also ==
- Philadelphia Ronald McDonald House
- Center for Applied Genomics at CHOP
- Penn Genome Frontiers Institute
- The Voice (CHOP)
