= FaceBase =

NIH-supported American dentistry initiative

FaceBase is an NIH-supported initiative that began in September 2009. Funded by the National Institute of Dental and Craniofacial Research, the FaceBase Consortium is a five-year initiative that systematically compiles the biological instructions to construct the middle region of the human face and precisely define the genetics underlying its common developmental disorders such as cleft lip and palate. A range of genetic and environmental factors are thought to contribute to facial clefting and FaceBase is designed to enhance investigations into these causes and their outcomes.

== FaceBase Biorepository ==
The FaceBase Biorepository is a collection or bank of DNA samples and information from families around the world to be used in research studies. Individuals with birth defects that involve the head, face, and eye can participate along with their family members. DNA is collected through blood or saliva and combined with information about the subject's family history and pregnancy history. The goal of the biorepository is to collect samples and data from 5,000 people to drive research studies on the genetic and environmental factors that contribute to craniofacial birth defects.

== Gene Wiki ==
So far, a number of genes have been found to play a role in craniofacial development and the FaceBase project is continuing to research these genes to better understand craniofacial birth defects such as cleft lip and palate. These genes include AXIN2, BMP4, FGFR1, FGFR2, FOXE1, IRF6, MAFB (gene), MMP3, MSX1, MSX2 (Msh homeobox 2), MSX3, PAX7, PDGFC, PTCH1, SATB2, SOX9, SUMO1 (Small ubiquitin-related modifier 1), TBX22, TCOF (Treacle protein), TFAP2A, VAX1, TP63, ARHGAP29, NOG, NTN1, WNT genes, and locus 8q24.

== FaceBase Hub ==
A key part of the initiative is the Hub, which intends to provide easily accessible craniofacial research data. The FaceBase Hub aims to allow scientists to more rapidly and effectively generate hypotheses and accelerate the pace of their research.

== See also ==
- NameBase
- Facebook
