= Life Is a Rock (But the Radio Rolled Me) =

Single by Reunion
- B-side: "Are You Ready to Believe"
- Released: September 1974
- Recorded: 1974
- Genre: Bubblegum pop
- Length: 3:30 / 2:54 (single)
- Label: RCA Victor
- Songwriters: Norman Dolph, Paul DiFranco, Joey Levine
- Producers: Joey Levine, Marc Bellack, Paul DiFranco

Reunion singles chronology
"Life Is a Rock (But the Radio Rolled Me)" (1974)	"Disco-tekin" (1975)

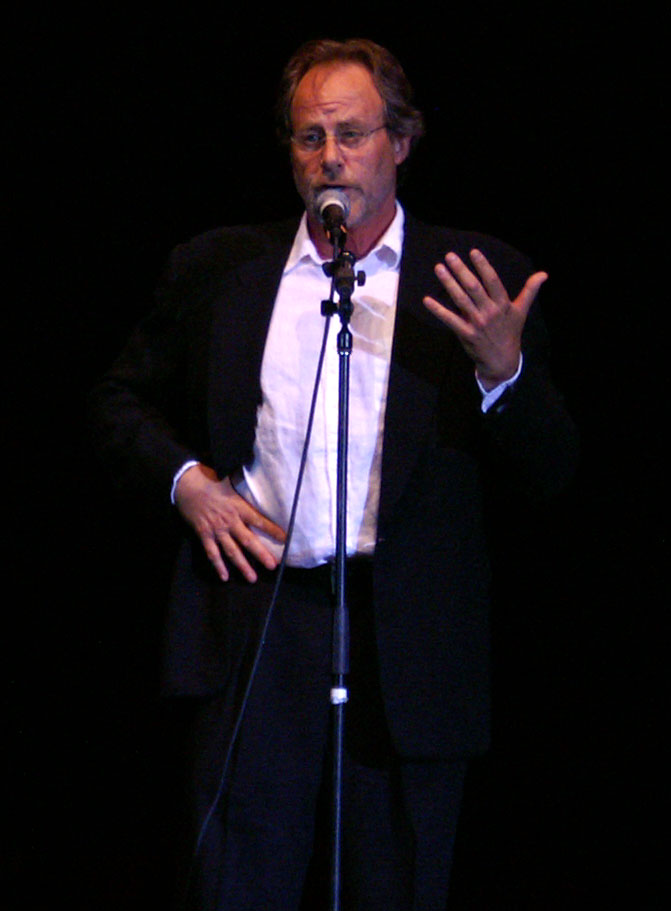
Joey Levine in concert. Taken on May 17, 2008.

"Life Is a Rock (But the Radio Rolled Me)" is a 1974 patter song written by Norman Dolph (lyrics) and Paul DiFranco (music). It was recorded by an ad hoc group of studio musicians called Reunion, with Joey Levine as lead singer. The lyrics are a fast recitation of the names of 1950s, 1960s, and 1970s musicians, songwriters, song titles, lyrics, disc jockeys, record labels, and more, broken only by the chorus. The song is similar to "I've Been Everywhere", which lists place names. Levine was previously lead singer and co-writer of bubblegum music hits "Yummy Yummy Yummy" and "Chewy Chewy" by Ohio Express. "Life Is a Rock" peaked at No. 8 on the Billboard Hot 100 chart and reached No. 33 on the UK Singles Chart.

The song's outro quotes "Baby I Need Your Loving" by the Four Tops, "Celebrate" by Three Dog Night, "I Want to Take You Higher" by Sly and the Family Stone, and "Uptight (Everything's Alright)" by Stevie Wonder.

The track was covered by Tracey Ullman in 1983, and was on her 1984 album, You Broke My Heart in 17 Places.

== Chart performance ==
=== Weekly charts ===
Chart (1974)	Peak position
Australia (Kent Music Report]	58
Canada RPM Top Singles	2
UK Singles Chart	33
US Billboard Hot 100	8
US Cash Box Top 100	7

=== Year-end charts ===
Chart (1974)	Rank
Canada	41

== Covers ==
The song was remade by Randy Crenshaw and released on 2001 Disney album Mickey's Dance Party under the name "Life Is a Rock (But the Radio Rolled Me...Again!)" The remake includes references not only to current and past music groups, but also to TV shows and internet slang, and some Disney characters.

A customized version of the song, "Life Is a Rock, but 'CFL Rolled Me", was the last rock and roll song played on the Larry Lujack show on WCFL in Chicago on March 15, 1976, before the station switched from Top 40 to beautiful music format. Rival AM station WLS had their own rendition: "Life Is a Rock, WLS Rolled Me". This was the first song played on WLS-FM when the famous callsign returned to the station in 2008, airing a classic hits format. In 1974, radio station KFRC in San Francisco also aired a specially tailored take on the song, "Life Is a Rock, but KFRC Rolled Me", with an extra verse naming all of the station's then-current personalities. The verse was sung by KFRC's afternoon personality Chuck Buell. 980, WRC in Washington, DC, also had a personalized version that was played on the air (this actually was common among the big Top 40 AMs of the day with special copies cut for their station).

Tracey Ullman recorded a cover that was included on her first album, You Broke My Heart in 17 Places, in 1983.

In 1988 McDonald's produced a jingle heavily influenced by the song for its "$1,000,000 Menu Song" promotion. The McDonald's recording, with an identical melody and a rapidly spoken list of menu offerings recited in an identical monotone pitch and rhythm, was released as a mass giveaway in the form of a 33-1/3 RPM flexible plastic single.

An early 1990s ad campaign for Tysons Corner Center in northern Virginia used the tune but substituted lyrics listing the stores found at the shopping mall at the time, naming the remake "We've Got 'Em All". The lyrics "We've got 'em all at Tysons Corner/Have we got a mall—Tysons Corner Center" served as the chorus.

== Name checks ==
- B. Bumble and the Stingers
- Mott the Hoople
- Ray Charles Singers
- Lonnie Mack
- Twangin' Eddy
- "Here's my ring, we're going steady"
- "Take It Easy"
- "I Want to Take You Higher"
- "Liar, Liar"
- "The Loco-Motion"
- Poco
- Deep Purple
- "(I Can't Get No) Satisfaction"
- Sam Cooke
- Lesley Gore
- Ritchie Valens
- Mahavishnu Orchestra
- "Fujiyama"
- Kama Sutra
- "Rama Lama Ding Dong"
- Richard Perry
- Phil Spector
- Jeff Barry
- The Righteous Brothers
- The Archies
- Harry Nilsson
- "Shimmy, Shimmy, Ko Ko Bop"
- Fats Is Back
- "Finger Poppin' Time"
- Friends and Romans
- Brenda & the Tabulations
- Carly Simon
- Noddy Holder
- Rolling Stone
- Johnny Cash
- Johnny Rivers
- The Shivers
- Mungo Jerry
- Peter, Paul and Mary
- "Mary, Mary"
- Dr. John, the Night Tripper
- Doris Day
- Jack the Ripper
- Shelter Records
- Leon Russell
- "Gimme Shelter"
- Smokey Robinson and the Miracles
- Slide guitar
- Fender bass
- Mushroom Omelette
- Bonnie Bramlett
- Wilson Pickett
- Arthur Janov
- The Primal Scream
- Screamin' Jay Hawkins
- Dale Hawkins
- Ronnie Hawkins
- Kukla, Fran and Ollie
- Norman, Oklahoma
- John Denver
- Donny Osmond
- J. J. Cale
- ZZ Top
- L.L. Bean
- "DeDe Dinah"
- David Bowie
- Steely Dan
- "Proud Mary"
- "CC Rider"
- Edgar Winter
- Joanie Sommers
- Ides of March (band)
- Johnny Thunder
- Eric Clapton
- Wah-wah pedal
- Stephen Foster
- "Camptown Races"
- "Good Vibrations"
- "Help Me Rhonda"
- "Surfer Girl"
- "Little Honda"
- "Tighter, Tighter"
- "Honey, Honey"
- "Sugar, Sugar"
- "Yummy Yummy Yummy"
- CBS
- Warner Bros.
- RCA ("...and all the others")
- "Remember (Walking in the Sand)"
- Rock 'em Sock 'em Robots
- Alan Freed
- Murray the K
- The Fish
- The Swim
- "The Boston Monkey"

The 45-rpm single version fades out here. The extended album version continues, with the following references:

- Freddie King
- Albert King
- B.B. King
- Felix Pappalardi
- Laurel and Hardy
- Randy Newman
- Aretha Franklin
- Tito Puente
- Boffalongo
- Cuba
- War
- California
- Beatlemania
- New York City
- Transylvania
- S&G
- Bobby Vee
- SRO
- Conway Twitty
- "Do Wah Diddy Diddy"

Performed as medley or spoken over the fade-out:

- "Baby I Need Your Loving" by The Four Tops
- "Uptight (Everything's Alright)" by Stevie Wonder
- "Celebrate" by Three Dog Night
- "I Want to Take You Higher" by Sly & the Family Stone

== See also ==
- List of 1970s one-hit wonders in the United States
