= List of McDonald's marketing campaigns =

This is a list of marketing promotions by McDonald's restaurants.

== Slogans ==
Here is a partial list of slogans:

=== Arab world ===
- استمتع بالفرق (Enjoy the difference) (pre-2003)
- انا احبه (I'm lovin' it) (2003–present)
- تعرف جودة مأكولاتنا (Check our food quality) (2006–present)

=== Argentina ===
- Ese momento para gran sabor de McDonald's ("It's a good time for the great taste of McDonald's") (1988)
- Esto es valor. Esto es McDonald's ("This is value. This is McDonald's") (1995–1999)
- Siempre un buen momento (Every time a good time) (1999–2003)
- Me Encanta (I'm lovin' it) (2003–present)

=== Australia ===
- You Deserve a Break Today (1971–1975)
- We got it all for you (1975–1980)
- You deserve a Break Today (1980–1984)
- Love a Burger, Love a McDonald's (1981)
- It's a Good Time for the Great Taste (1984–1988)
- McDonald's is cooking ... breakfast! (1987–1991)
- The Good Time, Great Taste of McDonald's (1988–1991)
- It's MacTime (1992-1997)
- It's MacTime Now (1991)
- It's MacTime Again (1994)
- MacTime Rocks On (1994, featured David Essex's song "Rock On")
- Only McDonald's (1998)
- Mac your Day (2000–2003)
- Big McDonald's (2001)
- I'm lovin' it (2003–present)
- Feed your inner child (2005)
- Hand in hand with Australia (2006–present)
- Bacon bacon bacon (2007, bacon menu)
- It's a Little Bit Fancy. (used for the "M Selections" line of products, 2009–present)
- It all comes together at Macca's. (2012–present)

=== Austria ===
- McDonald's ist einfach gut
- Everytime a good time (1999–2003)
- I'm lovin' it (2003–present)
- Ich liebe es (2003–present)

=== The Bahamas ===
- We love to see you smile (2000–2003)
- I'm lovin' it (2003–present)

=== Brazil ===
- É um bom momento para o delicioso sabor do McDonald's (It's a good time for the great taste of McDonald's) (1984–1994)
- Esse é o momento que gostoso que é McDonald's (1987–1994)
- Gostoso como a vida deve ser (Tasty like life should be) (1994–2003)
- Amo Muito Tudo Isso (I'm lovin' it) (2003–present)

=== Bulgaria ===
- "Ресторант за цялото семейство" (The restaurant for whole family) (1994–1999)
- "Усмивка в твоя ден" (Every time a good time) (1999–2003)
- "I'm lovin' it" (2003–present)

=== Canada ===
==== English ====
- McDonald's is your kind of place (1967–1971)
- You deserve a break today (1971–1975)
- McDonald's Sure is Good to Have Around (1974, concurrent with 1971 slogan)
- We do it all for you (also known as You, you're the one) (1975–1979) (Note: This slogan is mentioned in an episode of Scare Tactics.)
- Nobody can do it like McDonald's can (1979–1981)
- Nobody can say good night like McDonald's can (1979)
- You deserve a break today/There's so much fun for you today (1981–1983)
- Nobody makes your day like McDonald's can (1980–1983)
- McDonald's and you (1983–1984)
- It's a good time for the great taste of McDonald's (1984–1988)
- Make It Mac Tonight (1986, Mac Tonight advertising)
- The good time, great taste of McDonald's (1988–1990)
- Food, folks and fun (1990–1991)
- Good food, good value (1991)
- McDonald's Today (1991–1992)
- What you want is what you get (1992–1997)
- Have you had your break today? (1995–1997)
- My McDonald's (1997)
- Did somebody say McDonald's? (1997–2000)
- We love to see you smile (2000–2001)
- Put a Smile On (2001)
- There's a little McDonald's in everyone (2001–2003)
- I'm lovin' it (2003–present)
- It's what I eat and what I do (2005, combined with 2003 slogan to make It's what I eat and what I do...I'm lovin' it)
- What we're made of (2008–2015)
- WcDonalds, WcD, ワクドナルド (2024)

==== French ====
- Vous méritez une pause aujourd'hui (You deserve a break today) (1972–1975, 1981-1983)
- Nous faisons tout pour vous (We do it all for you) (1975–1979)
- Personne ne peut le faire comme McDonald's (Nobody does it like McDonald's) (1979–1981)
- Il y a tellement de plaisir pour vous aujourd'hui (There's so much fun for you today) (1981–1983)
- Moi J'm McDonald (Me I love McDonald's) (1982–2003) (Note: This happens to be the longest-running slogan in Quebec and was teamed up with U.S. campaign slogan themes from 1982 until 1995 and the Have you had your break today? theme from 1995 until 2003.)
- Pour vos p'tits bouts de sous (For your little bits of money) (2000)
- C'est ça que j'm (Note: The letter "m" has the same sound in French as "aime" (love). This slogan was coined by an ad agency in 1982.) (It's that which I love) (2003–)
- Venez comme vous etes (2018)
- WcDonald, WcDo, ワクドナルド (2024)

=== Chile ===
- Que Momento. Que Sabor. (1992)
- Un Momento Especial, Cada Dia (A special moment, every day) (1999–2003)
- Me Encanta Todo Eso (All that I love) (2003–2012)
- Me Encanta (I'm lovin' it) (2003–2012, secondary)
- I'm lovin' it (2013–2023)
- Me gustas así (2023-present)

=== China ===
- 我就喜歡 (I'm lovin' it) (2003–present)

=== Costa Rica ===
- su clase de lugar! (1974)
- es el monento para el gran sabor (1986-1990)
- Es el momento de desayunar (1986)
- Que momento. Que Sabor (1990)
- Me Encanta (I'm lovin' it) (2003–present)

=== Czech Republic ===
- McDonald's je prostě fajn (McDonald's is simply fine) (1992–1999)
- Každý den, skvělý den (Every time a good time) (1999–2003)
- I'm lovin' it (2003–present)

=== El Salvador ===
- Esse Momento para gran Sabor de McDonald's (1986)
- que momento. que sabor. (1992)
- Me Encanta (I'm lovin' it) (2003–present)
- ¡McDonald's Está Chivisimo! (McDonald's is Cool!) (2009)
- Que bueno que Viniste (2014)

=== Finland ===
- Uskomatonta. Mutta totta. (pre-2003)
- I'm lovin' it (2003–present)

=== France ===
- Ca se passe comme ca chez McDonald's (It happens like that at McDonald's) (1985–2003)
- C'est Tout Ce Que J'aime (That's all I Like/I'm lovin' it) (2003–present)
- Venez comme vous êtes (Come as You Are) (2008–present)

=== Georgia ===
- აი, რა მიყვარს (I'm lovin' it) (2012–present)
- რესტორანი მთელი ოჯახისთვის (Restaurant for the whole family) (2015–present)

=== Germany ===
- Das etwas andere Restaurant (The somewhat different restaurant) (1971–1977)
- Essen mit Spaß (Eating with fun) (1978–1982)
- Gut, dass es McDonald's gibt (It's good that McDonald's exists) (1982–1987)
- Der Platz, wo Du gern bist, weil man gut isst (The place where you like to be because you eat well) (1987–1991)
- McDonald's ist einfach gut (McDonald's is simply good) (1991–1999)
- Every time a good time (1999–2003)
- Ich liebe es (I'm lovin' it) (2003–present)

=== Guatemala ===
- Esse momento para gran sabor de McDonald's (1984–1995)
- El sabor de la alegría (The Taste of Joy) (1995–2003)
- Me encanta (I'm lovin' it) (2003–present)

=== Honduras ===
- Esta en tu sonrisa (pre-2003)
- Me encanta (I'm lovin' it) (2003–present)

=== Hong Kong ===
==== English ====
- You deserve a break today (1975–1979)
- Nobody can do it like McDonald's can (1979–1984)
- Good Times and Great Tastes (1984–1985)
- It's a good time for the great taste of McDonald's (1984–1988)
- Good time, great taste (that's why this is our place) (1988–1993)
- Make It Mac Tonight (1988-1989, Mac Tonight advertising)
- Only McDonald's (1993–1995)
- Every time a good time (2000–2003)
- I'm lovin' it (2003–present)
- Come down to Mac Tonight (2006-2010)
- You are the sunshine of my life (2011–2014)
- #LittleBigMoments (2018-2019)
- FeelingGood (2019-2021)

==== Cantonese ====
- 宜家最好嘆返陣 (You deserve a break today) (1975–1979)
- 確係唔同! (Nobody can do it like McDonald's can) (1979–1984)
- 味美歡笑 (Good time, great taste (that's why this is our place)) (1988–1993)
- 唯有麥當勞 (Only McDonald's) (1993–1995)
- 開心無價麥當勞 (Priceless Happiness McDonald's) (1995-2000)
- 秒秒鐘歡聚歡笑 (Every time a good time) (2000–2003)

=== Hungary ===
- McDonald's azért, mert jó (McDonald's because it's good) (1990s-1999)
- Ahol jó lenni, ahol jó enni (Where it's good to be, where it's good to eat) (1996–1999)
- Minden alkalom jó alkalom (Every time a good time) (1999–2003)
- I'm lovin' it (2003–present)

=== Iceland ===
- I'm lovin' it (2003–2009)

=== India ===
- McDonald's mein hai kuch baat. (October 13, 1996 – 1999)
- Every time a good time (1999–2003)
- I'm lovin' it (2003–present)

=== Indonesia ===
- Good Time, Great Taste (1991–1998)
- Saat santai, rasa lezat di McDonald's (Relaxing time, delicious taste at McDonald's) (1991–1998)
- Mana lagi selain di McD (Where else but McDonald's?) (1998–2003; February 2016 – 25th anniversary of McDonald's Indonesia; November 2019–present) or Mana lagi selain di Mekdi (March 2023 – present)
- I'm lovin' it (2003–present)
- Come down to Mac Tonight (2007-2008)
- Ini McD Kita (This is our McDonald's) (February 2021 – 2022 – 30th anniversary of McDonald's Indonesia)
- Ada McD, Ada Kita (There's McDonald's, there's us, 2022–present)

=== Israel ===
- I'm lovin' it (2003–present)

=== Italy ===
- Sorridi di gusto con McDonald's(1985-1990s)
- Succede solo da McDonald's (1990s–1999)
- Every time a good time (1999–2003)
- I'm lovin' it (2003–present)

=== Jamaica ===
- at my McDonald's (1996)
- I'm lovin' it (2003–2005)

=== Japan ===
- 味なことやる! マクドナルド! (The taste that does it... McDonald's!) (1973–1978)
- 世界のことば! マクドナルド! (The world's word... McDonald's!) (1978–1985)
- おいしい笑顔! マクドナルド! (A delicious smile from... McDonald's!) (1985–1989)
- だから, マクドナルド! (Because... McDonald's!) (1989–1995)
- いい顔いっぱい、バリューがいっぱい。 (Full of goodness, full of value) (1995–1998)
- みんなはマクドナルドを愛して (Everyone loves McDonald's) (1998–2003)
- I'm lovin' it (2003–present)
- ワクドナルド, WCDONALD (2009)
- Wcdonald (2023-present)
- ジュジュ・ブレナーが新たなブレイクダウンへ, マクドナルド! (Juju Brener to the new Breakdown, McDonald's!) (2023–present)

=== Malaysia ===
- It's a good time for the great taste of McDonald's (1984–1988)
- Masa riang, rasa hebat (1984–2001)
- The good time, great taste of McDonald's (1988–2001)
- Segalanya untukmu (Everything for you) (1995–2002)
- Makan di McD (2002–2003)
- I'm lovin' it (2003–present)
- Come down to Mac Tonight (2007-2008)
- Sama-Sama (2015–present)

=== Mexico ===
- Ese momento para gran sabor de McDonald's (1989-1992)
- ¡Mas valor por su dinero! (1995)
- Qué gusto verte sonreír (We love to see you smile) (2000–2003)
- Me encanta (I'm lovin' it) (2003–present)

=== New Zealand ===
- We've got it all (June 7, 1976 – 1980)
- You deserve a Break Today (1980–1984)
- Love a Burger, Love a McDonald's (1981)
- It's a Good Time for the Great Taste (1984–1988)
- The good time, great taste of McDonald's (1988–1992)
- Grab the Moment (early 1990s)
- It's gonna be a lovely day (1994–2000, breakfast weekdays)
- It's gonna be a great weekend (1994–2000, breakfast weekends)
- It's Mac Time (late 1990s)
- That's our tucker (1990s & 2005)
- Every time a good time (2000 – October 3, 2003)
- I'm lovin' it (October 4, 2003 – present)
- Proud to be part of the change (2006–2009)
- It's a Little Bit Fancy. (2009, used for the "M Selections" line of products)
- More than you expect (2011) =)
- Just because (2011–present)

=== Netherlands ===
- "U verdient een pauze vandaag." ("You deserve a break today.") (1971–1981)
- "McDonald's maakt meer van lekker uit eten." ("McDonald's makes more of eating out.")
- "Ze zei meneer tegen me." ("She called me Sir!")
- "Je mag hier met je handjes eten" ("You can eat with your hands here")
- "McDonald's is altijd goed" ("McDonald's is always good") (early 1990s)
- "Welkom" ("Welcome") (mid 1990s)
- "Gek op Mac" ("Crazy about Mac")
- "Every time a good time" (2000–2003)
- "I'm lovin' it" (2003–present)
- "Vinden we leuk" ("We like it") (2012)
- "Voor iedereen" ("For all") (2014–present)

=== Norway ===
- Spis den beste maten! (Eat the best food!) (1999–2003)
- Må få min smak! (Must get my taste!) (2003–2003)
- I'm lovin' it (2003–present)
- Hvis Du Vil (If You Want) (2004, Greek Salad commercials)

=== Panama ===
- Me encanta (I'm lovin' it) (2003–2012)
- I'm lovin' it (2013–present)

=== Paraguay ===
- Me encanta! (I'm lovin' it) (2003–present)

=== Peru ===
- Nos encanta verte sonreir. (We Love to see you smile) (pre-2003)
- Me encanta (I'm lovin' it) (2003–2012)
- I'm lovin' it (2013–present)

=== Philippines ===
- It's A Good Time for the Great Taste. (1984–1988)
- The Good Time, Great Taste of McDonald's. (1988–1994)
- Ang Sarap ulitin! (So delicious repeating it!) (1994–2000)
- Kita Kits sa McDo (See you at McDo) (January 2000 – October 2003)
- Love ko 'to (I'm lovin' it) (October 2003–present)
- Come down to Mac Tonight (June 29-August 31, 2007)
- Hooray for Today! (2011–2016)
- WcDonald's, WcDo, Waccas, ワクドナルド (2024)

=== Poland ===
- Restauracja inna niż wszystkie (The restaurant different from the rest) (1992–1999)
- W McDonald's spotkajmy się (Let's meet at McDonald's) (1992–1999)
- Każdy dzień to Twój dzień (Every Time A Good Time) (1999–2003)
- I'm lovin' it (2003–present)
- Mam smaka na Maka (I have a taste for McDonald's) (2015–present)

=== Portugal ===
- Momentos mais saborosos (Delicious moments) (1996 – September 2003)
- Só pode ser McDonald's (2001–2003)
- I'm lovin' it (October 2003 – April 2017)
- Gosto tanto (I'm lovin' it) (April 2017 – May 2022)
- Há Sempre um M (There's always an M) (May 2022 – May 2024)
- Tu Mereces Mac (You Deserve Mac) (May 2024 – present)

=== Puerto Rico ===
- Vamos pa McDonald's. (1990s)
- i'm lovin' it (2003–present)

=== Romania ===
- Restaurantul întregii familii (Restaurant for the whole family) (1995-1999)
- McDonald's te așteaptă mereu (McDonald's is always waiting for you) (1995-1999)
- Te simți bine oricând (Every time a good time) (1999-2003)
- I'm lovin' it (2003–present)

=== Russia ===
- Весело и вкусно в McDonald's (It's fun and tasty at McDonald's) (1990–1999)
- Здесь хорошо всегда (It's always good here) (1999–2003)
- Bот что я люблю (This is what I love) (2003–2022)
- I'm lovin' it (2003–2022, secondary)

=== Singapore ===
- I'm lovin' it (2003–present)
- My Lovely Place (2021–present)

=== Slovakia ===
- McDonald's je proste fajn (McDonald's is simply fine) (1995–1999)
- Každý deň, skvelý deň (Every time a good time) (1999–2003)
- i'm lovin' it (2003–present)

=== Slovenia ===
- Every time a good time (1999–2003)
- i'm lovin' it (2003–present)

=== South Africa ===
- Make every day a McDonald's day (1995–2003)
- i'm lovin' it (2003–present)

=== Spain ===
- Lo que me importa eres tú (What matters to me is you) (1982)
- El sitio que te gusto (The place that you like) (1984)
- Sabemos lo que te gusta (We know what you like) (1998–2003)
- I'm lovin' it (2003–present)

=== Sweden ===
- It's a Good Time for the Great Taste (1984)
- The Good Time, Great Taste of McDonald's (1988)
- Kom till McDonald's–vi ger mer (1993) (Come to McDonald's–We give more)
- Livet har sina goda stunder (1996) (Life has its good moments)
- Every Time a Good Time (1999 – July 2003)
- Gotta Get My Taste (July 2003 – 2003)
- i'm lovin' it (2003–present, meals)
- Stora nog att göra skillnad (2018–present, sustainability work, Ronald McDonald Hus) (Big enough to make a difference)

=== Taiwan ===
- 麥當勞簡直是不錯的 (McDonald's is simply good) (1990s–1999)
- 每一次的好時機 or 歡聚歡笑每一刻 (Every time a good time) (1999–2003)
- I'm lovin' it (2003–present)

=== Trinidad and Tobago ===
- i'm lovin' it (2003, 2011–present)

=== Turkey ===
- McDonald's Gibisi Yok! (1994–2003, 2006–present)
- İşte Bunu Seviyorum (2003–present)

=== United Kingdom and Ireland ===
- You'll enjoy the difference (1974-1980, 1987)
- There's a difference at McDonald's You'll Enjoy (1974–1986, 1987)
- At McDonald's we've got time for you (1985–1988)
- A Visit To McDonald's Makes Your Day (1988–1992)
- There's nothing quite like a McDonald's (1992–1997)
- Enjoy more (1997–2001)
- Only McDonald's (2001–2003)
- Things that make you go MMMMMM! (2002–2003)
- i'm lovin' it (2003–present)
- It's What I eat and what I do
- Good food, fast. (2005)
- The Sign of a Good Burger (2006)
- Make Up Your Own Mind (2006)
- Oh! Burger (2007)
- Some fun, some food, it's all inside this Happy Meal. (2007–present, used for Happy Meal campaigns.)
- Some fun, some food and one of your five a day! (2009–2017, originally known as "Some fun, some food and one of your five a day, at McDonald's!" used for Happy Meal's five a day fruit/vegetables campaigns.)
- That's what makes McDonald's (2008–present)
- That's McDonald's...and then some (2009–present)
- That's McDonald's...but cozy (Used for the Winter Menu in 2009)
- That's McDonald's...with Yee-Hah! (Used for the Tastes of America series in 2009)
- That's McDonald's...but Summery (Summer 2009)
- That's McDonald's...but Merrier (Used for the Festive Menu in 2009)
- There's a McDonald's for everyone (2009–2014)
- Good Times (2014–present)
- Fancy a McDonald's? (2021–present)

=== Ukraine ===
- Ресторан для всієї родини (Restaurant for the whole family) (1997–1999)
- Кожен раз гарний час (Every time a good time) (1999–2003)
- Я це люблю (I'm lovin' it) (2003–present)

=== Uruguay ===
- Valor delicioso. (Delicious value.) (1991–2003)
- Me Encanta! (I love it!) (2003 – December 31, 2012)
- I'm lovin' it (January 1, 2013–present)

=== United States ===
==== English ====
- Let's eat out! (1960–1965)
- Look for the Golden Arches! (1960–1967)
- Go for the Goodness at McDonald's (1962–1969)
- The closest thing to home (1966–1969)
- McDonald's is your kind of place (1967 – January 22, 1971)
- You deserve a break today (1971–1975)
- Enjoy the best food at McDonald's (1973, concurrent with 1971 slogan)
- McDonald's Sure is Good to Have Around (1974, concurrent with 1971 slogan)
- We do it all for you (also known as You, you're the one) (1975–1979)
- Nobody can do it like McDonald's can (1979–1981)
- Nobody can say good night like McDonald's can (1979)
- You deserve a break today/There's so much fun for you today (August 21, 1981–January 1983)
- Nobody makes your day like McDonald's can (1980 – August 21, 1981)
- That's My McDonald's (1981, concurrent with 1980 slogans)
- We cook it all for you at McDonald's (1982, concurrent with 1980 slogans)
- McDonald's and you (October 1982– April 16, 1984)
- It's a good time for the great taste of McDonald's (April 16, 1984 – April 10, 1988, this slogan was used on newspapers from April 16, 1984, until March 6, 1990, and in November 1993)
- 30 years of good times and great taste (1985, 30th anniversary)
- Make it Mac Tonight (1986, Mac Tonight advertising)
- McDonald's is your place to be (1986)
- Takin' breakfast by the hand (1986–1992)
- The good time, great taste of McDonald's (1988–1990)
- You Deserve A Break Today (1989–1991, concurrent with 1988 slogan)
- Food, folks and fun (February 1990, March 7, 1990 – March 18, 1991)
- McDonald's Today (1991–1992)
- What you want is what you get (1992–1995)
- What you want is what you get at RocDonald's today (1994, The Flintstones promotion)
- McDonald's, where what you want is what you get (1994, Sonic the Hedgehog promotion)
- What you want is what you get, delivered from McDonald's today (1994, McDelivery trial)
- Do you believe in magic? (March 17, 1992 – October 15, 1997, Ronald McDonald and Happy Meal McDonald's ads)
- Ronald Makes it Magic (February 17, 1995 – October 15, 1997, Ronald McDonald and Happy Meal McDonald's ads)
- Have you had your break today? (1995–1997)
- One Two Three Four... Big Mac burger! (1997)
- My McDonald's (February 19 – October 1, 1997)
- Did somebody say McDonald's? (1997–2000)
- We love to see you smile (2000–2003)
- Put a Smile On (2001–2003)
- Smile (2001–2003)
- (ba, da, ba, ba, ba) I'm lovin' it (2003–present)
- It's what I eat and what I do (2005, combined with 2003 slogan to make It's what I eat and what I do...I'm lovin' it)
- What we're made of (2008–2015)
- Gimme Back that Filet-O-Fish (2009–2015, Filet-O-Fish advertising)
- You want it, need it, you gotta have a taste of McDonald's burgers (December 1, 2010 – 2013, Big Mac, Quarter Pounder, Angus Burger advertising)
- The simple joy of McDonald's (2010–2013)
- A whole new way to love McDonald's (2013–2015)
- There's something for everyone to love at McDonald's (2013–2015)
- Choose Lovin (2015–2018)
- WcDonald's, WcD's, ワクドナルド (2024)

==== Spanish ====
- Este es el momento del gran sabor en McDonald's (April 16, 1984 – April 10, 1988)
- Como se antoja McDonald's? (1995–1997)
- Mi McDonald's (1997)
- Alguien dijo McDonald's? (1997–2000)
- Que gusto verte sonreir (2000–2003)
- Sonrie (2003)
- Me encanta (2003–Present)

== Jingles ==
Perhaps the best-known jingle was "You deserve a break today" a song sometimes incorrectly attributed to a young Barry Manilow, (who did sing it in one version of the commercial and thus included it in his "Very Strange Medley" of product theme songs, with others he had written) was in fact, written by jingle singer/songwriter Kenny Karen. The melody was either used in, or originates from, a song called "We're Together", credited on The Brass Ring S/T album as being composed by A. Ham/K. Gavin/N. Kipner/S. Woloshin. In the accompanying TV commercial, there was almost no mention of food. Instead, the ad featured an all-male McDonald's cleaning crew, singing after-hours about their individual tasks, and emphasizing that "at McDonald's it's clean!" just before launching into the almost operatic chorus: "You deserve a break today / So get up and get away / To McDonald's!"

Another well known jingle was the "McDonald's is your kind of place / It's such a happy place / Hap, hap, hap, happy place..." from 1967, sung to the tune of "Down by the Riverside".

=== Big Mac ===
==== English (1974–) ====
Two all beef patties, special sauce, lettuce, cheese, pickles, onions on a sesame seed bun.

==== Portuguese (1987–) ====
Dois hambúgeres, alface, queijo, molho especial, cebola, e picles num pão com gergelim.

==== Russian (1990–2022) ====
Две мясных котлеты гриль, специальный соус, сыр, огурцы, салат и лук – всё на булочке с кунжутом. Только так, и это БигМак.

=== "McDonald's and You!" (1983–1984) ===
McDonald's and you. McDonald's and you. Sharing good times together wherever with you. McDonald's and you, and you, and you! Sharing the good time and no matter where we do. Remember there's only one McDonald's and there's only one you. You! Together, McDonald's and you!

=== "It's a good time for the great taste" (1984–1988) ===
It's a good time for the great taste of McDonald's.

There is also a full version used in one commercial.

It's a good time for the great taste. It's a good time for the great taste of McDonald's. It's a good time for the great taste, gotta gotta get a bite. Gotta get going to just one place, got a McDonald's appetite. Going for McNuggets, Coke, Big Mac, Quarter Pounder, fries keep color you fast. It's a good time for the great taste of McDonald's. Good time, great taste. It's a good time (good time) for the great taste (great taste). It's a good time (good time) for the great taste (great taste). It's a good time (good time) for the great taste, taste, taste, taste, taste of McDonald's. Let's go!

=== Good Time, Great Taste (1988–1990) ===
Good Time, Great Taste. That's why this is our place! The Good Time, Great Taste of McDonald's.

There is also a full version sung by Ronald McDonald, some kids, and the McDonaldland gang in one commercial.

What a great day for singing our new song. Good Time, Good Time. Great Taste, Great Taste. That's why this is our place. Our place! The Good Time, Great Taste of McDonald's. Good Time, Great Taste. Rabba rabba. That's why this is our place! Our place! The Good Time, Great Taste of McDonald's. Rabba-rabba burger rabba shake stomp de domp. Rabba-rabba fries rabba shake stomp de domp. Rabba-rabba shake rabba shake stomp de domp. Good time, Great Taste, McDonald's! Here's the spot! Good Time, Great Taste. That's why this is our place! The Good Time, Great Taste of Mc-D-o-n-a-l-d-s, Mc-D-o-n-a-l-d-s. The Good Time, Great Taste of McDonald's. McDonald's! Yay!

=== A Visit to McDonald's Makes Your Day (UK, 1988–1992) ===
Make your day, make your way to the sign that says 'you're welcome'! A visit to McDonald's makes your day!

=== Food, Folks and Fun (1990–1991) ===
It's food, folks and fun. Food, folks and fun. You know the one, McDonald's, for food, folks and fun.

There is also a full version used in one commercial.

There's a new-fangled daddy comin' down the street, a modern mama, and the two compete in a high-tech world, complete an oasis, a place where you can get back to basics. It's food, folks and fun. (You'll like it for fun!) Food, folks and fun. (McDon-McDon-McDonald's!) You know the one, McDonald's, (You know the one!) for food, folks and fun.

=== McDonald's Today (1991–1992) ===
Here today, here to stay. You deserve a break today. McDonald's today.

=== What you want is what you get (1992–1994) ===
What you want is what you get at McDonald's today.

There was also an extended version used in one commercial which goes like this:

What you want is what you get, every day in every way. What you want is what you get at McDonald's today. What you want is what you get, every day in every way. What you want is what you get at McDonald's today. At McDonald's today.

There was also a full version used in 25 years of The best of McDonald's on TV VHS which goes like this:

You've always know just what you want, always got just what you need. Anything you looking for, and there a little more. And every year go by my friends, these sudden things you can depend onto go your way, really make your day. What you want is what you get, every day in every way. What you want is what you get at McDonald's today. What you want is what you get, every day in every way. What you want is what you get at McDonald's today.

=== Have you had your break today? (1995–1997) ===
Have you had your break today? We all need to get away. There's one place that's on your way, McDonald's is your break today, Have you had your break today? Oh, feast yourself the McDonald's way. Spend a little money for a smile in your tummy. Have you had your break today? Eat a nibble, you deserve breaks today. Oh Yeah! La, La! Go to McDonald's too with your ki, kid. Have you had your break today? You deserve the McDonald's way. There's a place with a smile in your face. Have you had your break today? Have you had your break today?

=== Have you had your break today? (Big Mac/Canadian version, 1995–1997) ===
There was also a Canadian version that also promoted the Big Mac.

Have you had your break today? Easy does it on your way. So much to love, so little to pay, McDonald's is your break today, Have you had your break today? Fun on the run and it's coming your way. Save a little money, put a smile in your tummy, have you had your break today? Feed me, please me, tempt me, tease me. I'm havin' a Big Mac Attack. Two all beef patties, special sauce, lettuce, cheese, rush me down to Mickey D's. Have you had your break today? Keep your eyes on the fries don't let 'em get away. Nothin', nothin', like an Egg McMuffin, have you had your break today? Have you had your break today?

=== Livet har sina goda stunder ===
This campaign was used in Sweden in 1996 and was recorded by Swedish band Ultima Thule.

Leva livet fritt och glatt, man vill inte sitta still
en plats, som alltid är ljus och varm och bara finnas till
träffa dom man tycker om, och göra vad man vill
Livet har sina goda stunder.

Doo wap ap ap a doo den do den doo wap ap ap a do den doo
Dagar kan passera fort som en våg på öppet hav
på McDonalds varva ner, hos oss finns inga krav
träffa dom man tycker om och bara koppla av
Livet har sina goda stunder.

=== Every time a good time ===
This campaign was used in Germany in 1999 and was originally recorded by Billy White and Patricia Darcy Jones. The campaign was also used in the Netherlands, New Zealand, Poland, Sweden, Taiwan, the Czech Republic, Hungary and Hong Kong. "Every time a good time" song was written by: David Buskin, Janet Fox, Susan Hamilton and published by TUTTAPANNA MUSIC.

When you need a change of pace
wanna put a smile into your day
Got your favorite place
when you want to just break away

Time after time
feel good, feel fine
McDonald's ... Every time a good time.

=== I'm lovin' it (2003–present) ===
ba-da-ba-ba-ba... i'm lovin' it.

There are also two full versions sung by Justin Timberlake. The first one was used in one commercial.

Ba da ba ba ba. I'm lovin' it. Is this the place to eat? Since I don't cook, I'll just rock to the beat. I'm lovin' it. At the end of the day, to relieve the stress, we add a little play. I'm lovin' it. Sometimes, we have mishaps. You should overcome and adapt to said facts. I'm lovin' it. You know you're in my world. You know you're in my world. I kick and I love taps from my girl. McDonald's. Ba da ba ba ba. I'm lovin' it. Move your feet, rock to the beat, hungry for the music, gotta eat. I'm lovin' it. I'm lovin' it. No guts, no glory. Seems like I've stumbled in the wrong territory. I'm lovin' it Who'd want to mock me? Run around the edges, a tad bit sloppy. I'm lovin' it. My car's way too clean. If only I could start this fine piece of machine. I'm lovin' it. Ba da ba ba ba. McDonald's, ba da ba ba ba, I'm lovin' it.

The second one was used in one commercial.

Ba da ba ba ba. I'm lovin' it. Is this the place to eat? Since I don't cook, I'll just rock to the beat. I'm lovin' it. At the end of the day, to relieve the stress, we add a little play. I'm lovin' it. Sometimes, we have mishaps. You should overcome and adapt to said facts. I'm lovin' it. You know you're in my world. You know you're in my world. I kick and I love taps from my girl. McDonald's. Ba da ba ba ba. I'm lovin' it. Move your feet, rock to the beat, hungry for the music, gotta eat. I'm lovin' it. I'm lovin' it. No guts, no glory. Seems like I've stumbled in the wrong territory. I'm lovin' it Looks can't be deceiving. There's a slight change of plans for the evening. I'm lovin' it. My car's way too clean. If only I could start this fine piece of machine. I'm lovin' it. Ba da ba ba ba. McDonald's, ba da ba ba ba, I'm lovin' it.

=== McDonald's menu song ===
The McDonald's $1,000,000 Menu Song was an instant-win promotion created as part of an advertising campaign, which ran from 1988 to early 1989. As the name suggests, the song, which was based on Reunion's 1974 hit single "Life Is a Rock (But the Radio Rolled Me)", incorporates all of the items (at that time) on the McDonald's menu: sandwiches, other lunch/dinner items, breakfast items, dessert items, and drinks, in that order.

==== Promotion overview ====
Either flexi-discs or cardboard records containing the song were attached to advertising inserts and distributed within newspapers across the United States. On all but one of the issued recordings, the chorus was not able to recite the song perfectly from start to finish; when the chorus made a mistake, the record was over. On the unique, prize-winning recording, the singers were able to complete the song; this record was a $1,000,000 instant winner.

Approximately 80 million records were distributed, and only one of them was a winner. The promotion was won by Galax, Virginia, resident Charlene Price, who used the money to purchase the convenience store where she worked.

===== United States =====
In the United States, the lyrics read as follows:

Big Mac, McDLT, a Quarter-Pounder with some cheese, Filet-O-Fish, a hamburger, a cheeseburger, a Happy Meal. McNuggets, tasty golden french fries, regular or larger size, and salads: chef or garden, or a chicken salad oriental. Big Big Breakfast, Egg McMuffin, hot hot cakes, and sausage. Maybe biscuits, bacon, egg and cheese, a sausage, danish, hash browns too. And for dessert hot apple pies, and sundaes three varieties, a soft-serve cone, three kinds of shakes, and chocolatey chip cookies. And to drink a Coca-Cola, Diet Coke, and orange drink, A Sprite and coffee, decaf too, A lowfat milk, also an orange juice. I love McDonald's, good time great taste, and I get this all at one place...

===== Canada =====
In Canada, the lyrics were as follows:

Big Mac, McDLT, a Quarter-Pounder with cheese, Filet-O-Fish, a hamburger, a cheeseburger, McChicken, and McNuggets, tasty golden french fries, regular or larger size, and salads: chef or garden, or a chicken salad oriental, and for breakfast: Egg McMuffin, hot hot cakes, and sausage. Maybe Omelette McMuffins all 3 kinds of danish, hash browns too. And for dessert hot apple pies, and sundaes three varieties, a soft-serve cone, three kinds of shakes, and chocolatey chip cookies. And to drink a Coca-Cola, Diet Coke, and orange drink, A Sprite and coffee and hot chocolate, also apple, orange, and grapefruit juice. I love McDonald's, good time great taste, and I get this all at one place...

===== Hong Kong =====
In Hong Kong, the lyrics were as follows:

Big Mac, Filet-O-Fish, Double Burger, french fries, hamburger, Egg McMuffin, cheeseburger, and apple pie. I'll have a McChicken and Sausage McMuffin, hot chocolate, Big Breakfast, orange juice, hash browns. A strawberry sundae, an icy cold Coke, a Sprite over here, a Fanta to go. A milk, hot cakes, it's time for tea, a chocolate shake, a cup of coffee for me. I love McDonald's, good time great taste, and I get this all at one place...

==== Québec ====
Around the same time (1989–90), a French version of the ad campaign was produced for Quebec; however, no promotion was attached.

The order given in this version was sandwiches, other lunch/dinner items, dessert items, drinks, and breakfast. The Québec lyrics were as follows:

Big Mac, McDLT, un quart de livre avec fromage, filet de poisson, un hamburger, un cheeseburger, un McPoulet, des McCroquettes, des frites dorées en deux formats. Salade du chef, ou du jardin, ou de poulet à l'orientale voilà sûrement un vrai régal. Et pour dessert: chausson aux pommes, biscuits aux brisures chocolatées, des laits frappés en trois saveurs, un sundae y a rien de meilleur, suivi d'un Coke diet, d'un Sprite, d'un Coke, d'une délicieuse root-beer, chocolat chaud, un, lait, un thé, ou un café en deux formats. Ommelette, McMuffin au jambon, rôties un frits avec bacon, œuf McMuffin, muffin anglais, crêpes, et saucisses danoise au pommes, servez-moi donc un jus d'orange, de pamplemousse, ou bien de pommes. J'aime McDonald, j'ai le goût c'est l`heure de savoir mon menu par cœur.

— McDonald's Canada: "Le menu chanté", 1989

==== Australia ====
The McDonald’s menu song was also versioned in Australia around 1990. The Australian lyrics were as follows:

I’ll have a big mac, quarter pounder, filet of fish, McFeast as well, a junior burger and cheese burger, chicken nuggets 6 or 9 with 4 delicious sauces and some golden french fries fries small and large, to drink I’ll have an orange juice, no coke, no make that diet coke, fanta, sprite, three kinds of shake, chocolate, strawberry, or vanilla, coffee, tea, hot apple pie, cookies and three different sundaes hot chocolate fudge, hot caramel or maybe strawberry, yeah my favourite, maybe breakfast hashbrowns, english muffins, jam and marmalade, a sausage and egg mcmuffin please, plus hotcakes with some maple syrup, bacon egg mcmuffin plus big breakfast or some scrambled eggs, I love mcdonalds, good time, great taste, and I get this all at one place...
