= Norman Dolph =

American music entrepreneur (1939–2022)

- Born: May 11, 1939; Tulsa, Oklahoma, U.S.
- Died: May 11, 2022 (aged 83); New Haven, Connecticut, U.S.
- Education: Will Rogers High School, Tulsa, Oklahoma
- Alma mater: Yale
- Spouse: Eve Dolph (m. 1995)

Norman Dolph (May 11, 1939 – May 11, 2022) was an American songwriter, painter, music industry executive and entrepreneur. He is most known for producing the first recordings of the rock band the Velvet Underground while a sales executive at Columbia Records. Dolph reportedly received an original painting from Andy Warhol in payment for his work.

== Biography ==
Born in Tulsa, Oklahoma, Dolph was a graduate of Yale (1960), with a degree in electrical engineering. While working for Columbia Records as an account representative in the Custom Pressing Division in 1967, and moonlighting as a DJ for his own mobile discothèque business (STOY, Inc.), he became involved in New York's vibrant art scene. Andy Warhol mentioned to Dolph that he had discovered a rock band he thought should make a record. That band was the Velvet Underground. Dolph bought studio time and oversaw the recording and the remix of the album that went on to become The Velvet Underground & Nico.

The album, however, was not initially destined for fame. It was originally presented by Dolph to his Columbia Records colleagues for their consideration and it was swiftly rejected. The original acetate of the recording was returned to Dolph who gave it to Warhol. It then disappeared for years, only later to surface on eBay where it sold for $20,000. Though a commercial and critical failure upon release, the record has since become one of the most influential and critically acclaimed rock albums in history, appearing at number thirteen on Rolling Stone magazine's list of the 500 Greatest Albums of All Time as well as being added to the 2006 National Recording Registry by the Library of Congress.

Dolph produced the 1969 album Switched-On Rock which capitalized on the previous year's success of Switched-On Bach by Wendy Carlos. For Switched-On Rock Dolph painstakingly tuned the Moog synthesizer which would drift out of tune every 15 minutes.

In 1972, Dolph began writing lyrics and publishing songs, garnering two major chart recordings, "Life Is a Rock (But the Radio Rolled Me)" performed by Reunion, and "Stay the Night" sung by Jane Olivor, and other recordings by K.C. and the Sunshine Band, Patti LuPone, Isaac Hayes, Millie Jackson, Tracey Ullman, Eddie Kendricks, The Earls, and Bill Medley. He also wrote the lyrics to the songs in the animated feature Attila and the Great Blue Bean.

In the late 1980s, Dolph, his collaborator Paul diFranco, and the recording artist Joey Levine entered an infringement suit against McDonald's, claiming an unauthorized use of an adaptation of "Life Is a Rock" in a commercial during a Super Bowl broadcast, and the subsequent pressing of eighty million flexible records bearing their version. That pressing represents one of the largest single pressing orders for copies of one record in the history of recorded music. The case was resolved out of court for an undisclosed sum.

In 1990, Dolph began to paint. Inspired by Barnett Newman's The Stations of the Cross, he traveled to Jerusalem and photographed the 14 Stations. On returning to NYC, he spent the summer painting 14 stark black and white pictures based on those photos. The paintings were originally exhibited in the 6th Biennale of Sacred Art at the Museo Stauros d'Arte Sacra Contemporanea (San Gabriele, Teramo Italy). He collaborated with poet the Rev. Mary McAnally, and published a book STATIONS – Paintings and Poems of Spiritual Journey, containing the images of his paintings, a narrative of the actual walk along Jerusalem's Via Dolorosa, and 50 poems.

Additionally, during the 1980s and 1990s, Dolph was a columnist for Success magazine, writing about software and topics of interest to entrepreneurs.

Dolph died from cancer on May 11, 2022, his 83rd birthday.
