= World's Largest Entertainment McDonald's =

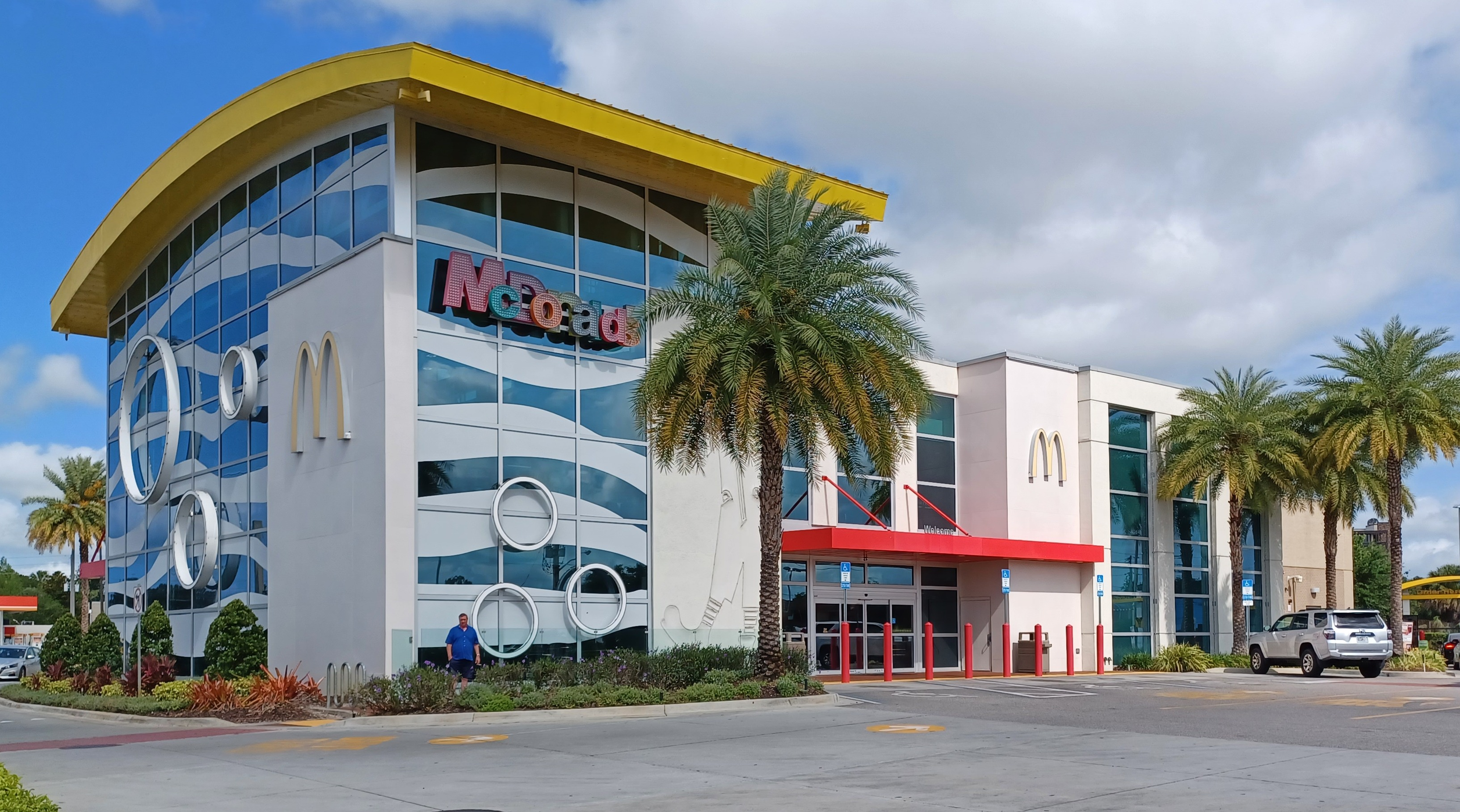
- The restaurant in 2023.
- Interactive map of World's Largest Entertainment McDonald's

Restaurant information
- Established: 1976
- Location: 6875 Sand Lake Road, Orlando, Florida, Orange County, Florida, 32819, United States
- Coordinates: 28°27′02″N 81°28′17″W

The World's Largest Entertainment McDonald's, also known as Epic McD, and formerly known as Mickey D's, is a McDonald's restaurant which opened in 1976 in Orlando, Florida. The restaurant has a floor area of 19,000 square feet (1,800 m^{2}), making it the second largest McDonald's in the world by square footage behind a McDonald's restaurant at Disneyland Paris. It offers menus with options that are exclusive to the restaurant and cannot be found elsewhere.

== Menu ==
In addition to the standard McDonald's menu, the World's Largest Entertainment McDonald's offers over 50 additional items, including brick oven pizza, Belgian waffles, customized pasta dishes, omelettes, and additional items on the "Gourmet Bistro" menu, along with an expanded dessert menu like ice cream.

== Restaurant ==
The World's Largest Entertainment McDonald's has three stories and offers a 22-foot-tall (6.7 m) PlayPlace since 1996, a Mac Tonight animatronic show, over 100 arcade games, and a waving 30-foot-tall (9.1 m) image of Ronald McDonald at the entrance. The original building was closed in 2015, then demolished, and rebuilt, reopening in 2016. The restaurant is open 24 hours and features a "Create Your Own" menu.
