= Switched-On Rock =

Studio album by the Moog Machine
- Released: 1969
- Genre: Electronic rock
- Length: 29:47
- Label: Columbia Records
- Producer: Norman Dolph

The Moog Machine chronology
Switched-On Rock (1969)	Christmas Becomes Electric (1969)

Switched-On Rock is an album by the Moog Machine, released in 1969 on Columbia Records. It comprises instrumental covers of popular songs from the 1960s, performed on the Moog synthesizer. It was one of a spate of albums capitalizing on the success of Switched-On Bach (1968), an album of Bach pieces performed on the Moog by Wendy Carlos.

Switched-On Rock was produced by Norman Dolph, who also wrote the liner notes. Dolph worked in the studio with colleagues Kenny Ascher and Alan Foust; they billed themselves as the Moog Machine for this and one more project. The album reached number 170 on the Billboard Top 200 and stayed on the chart for eight weeks.

== Background ==
Norman Dolph joined Columbia Records in 1964. As a marketing executive, he focused on recording projects aimed at the youth market. In 1967 he paid for the recording session of the album The Velvet Underground & Nico, and he helped engineer it.

After the 1968 album Switched-On Bach was seen to sell 500,000 copies, a number of albums were made to satisfy this new demand for synthesizer music. Wendy Carlos followed up Switched-On Bach with The Well-Tempered Synthesizer in the classical music category. Popular albums such as Switched On Bacharach, Switched-On Country, Switched-On Santa, Switched-On Gershwin, Moog Power and Music to Moog By were produced by others.

== Production ==
The idea for Switched-On Rock was conceived by Columbia Records marketing executive Russell "Russ" Barnard. Barnard assigned the project to three men: Dolph supervised the album and he tuned the Moog modular synthesizer, and his associates jazz pianist Kenneth "Kenny" Ascher and arranger Alan Foust played the keyboards and wrote the song arrangements, respectively. An attempt was made to synthesize drum sounds for the songs, but Dolph felt that the results sounded "kind of mechanical and ricky-tick." Instead, a rock drum kit was played by session drummer Leon Rix.

The Moog synthesizer was difficult to work with, as it is a very complex device with many knobs, and a slight movement of any knob could radically change the sound. It also tended to drift in musical pitch such that Dolph determined to tune it every 15 minutes. Finally, the Moog was monophonic, meaning that only one note could be played at a time. If a chord was fingered on the Moog's keyboard, only the lowest note would sound; chords heard on the album were built up over several takes, or they were synthesized on a chordal device called the "protorooter".

The songs were arranged by Foust as if any conceivable texture was available; following his charts, the Moog was tuned to synthesize each imagined texture. Some of the sounds heard on the album were discovered by "auspicious" accident while working toward something else. Using a 16-channel tape recorder, all ten songs were built up track-by-track in parallel; once a certain basic Moog sound was achieved, it could be used as appropriate for each song, with slight adjustments. Approximately 150 different textures were synthesized on the Moog for the album. In addition to the drum kit there was one other non-Moog instrument; in the liner notes Dolph challenged the listener to identify this instrument. Stereo Review responded by writing that they "haven't the vaguest idea what the other instrument is."

Dolph said that the production team coined new words for some of the Moog textures, for instance they decided the word "gwiping" would describe "the act of sweeping a filter with a high regeneration setting... from top to bottom." Accordingly, a basic Moog organ sound which was "gwiped" became a "gworgan". They also coined "pagwipe" (a leaky bagpipe), "jivehive" (many bees swarming on the same pitch) and the "sweetswoop" (the roaring of a jet with harmonics).

== Critical reception ==
Switched-On Rock was not praised by critics: at the Los Angeles Times, Robert Hilburn said, "rarely has rock music sounded so bad," while the UK's Melody Maker called it boring and "an artistic failure."

However, in its September 1970 issue, Stereo Review magazine gave it a "Recording of Special Merit" designation. Reviewer Peter Reilly said, "this is one of the most entertaining albums of the year" and "The recorded sound is truly superb and the engineering immaculate."

== Track listing ==
No.	Title	Writer(s)	Original performer	Length
1.	"Spinning Wheel"	David Clayton-Thomas	Blood, Sweat & Tears	3:17
2.	"Jumpin' Jack Flash"	Jagger/Richards	The Rolling Stones	3:17
3.	"The 59th Street Bridge Song (Feelin' Groovy)"	Paul Simon	Simon & Garfunkel	2:39
4.	"Get Back"	Lennon–McCartney	The Beatles	2:38
5.	"Yummy Yummy Yummy"	Arthur Resnick, Joey Levine	Ohio Express	2:27
6.	"The Weight"	Robbie Robertson	The Band	2:23
7.	"Time of the Season"	Rod Argent	The Zombies	3:44
8.	"Aquarius/Let the Sunshine In"	James Rado, Gerome Ragni, Galt MacDermot	The 5th Dimension	3:10
9.	"You Keep Me Hangin' On"	Holland–Dozier–Holland	The Supremes	2:27
10.	"Hey Jude"	Lennon–McCartney	The Beatles	3:45
Total length:				29:47

== Personnel ==
- Kenny Ascher – keyboards
- Alan Foust – arranger
- Norman Dolph – producer, tuner
- Leon Rix – drums
- Stew Romain – engineer
- Fred Plaut – engineer
- Frank Laico – engineer
- Art Kendy – engineer
- George Engfer – engineer
- George Knuerr – equipment
- Ron Pellegrino – production assistant
- Barney Beck – production assistant
- Russell Barnard – concept
- John McClure – executive producer
- Alan Kaplan – front cover image

== Legacy ==
After Switched-On Rock was released, Dolph, Ascher and Foust quickly regrouped as the Moog Machine to create one more album, this time featuring Christmas songs. The album Christmas Becomes Electric was released in late 1969.

In 1972, Isao Tomita produced a similar album of rock covers using the Moog synthesizer for CBS/Sony, Japan and was originally titled Switched On Hit & Rock with no artist credited on the cover. In 1974 it was subsequently issued in the UK on CBS as Electric Samurai: Switched on Rock. Tomita also incorporated his experiments in voice synthesis.

Switched-On Rock has been sampled by a handful of artists. In 1994, the Beastie Boys sampled the Moog Machine's cover version of "Aquarius/Let the Sunshine In" for their song "Get It Together", using the sample prominently as a loop. In 2000 the Avalanches used several samples of "Aquarius/Let the Sunshine In" for the songs "Close to You" and "Diners Only" on their debut album Since I Left You, an album which used approximately 3,500 samples from a wide range of vinyl pressings.
