= 2016 Bojangles' Southern 500 =

Race details
- Race 25 of 36 in the 2016 NASCAR Sprint Cup Series
- Layout of Darlington Raceway
- Date: September 4, 2016
- Location: Darlington Raceway in Darlington, South Carolina
- Course: Permanent racing facility
- Course length: 1.366 miles (2.198 km)
- Distance: 367 laps, 501.322 mi (806.666 km)
- Average speed: 126.437 mph (203.481 km/h)

Pole position
| Driver | Kevin Harvick | Stewart–Haas Racing |
- Time: N/A

Most laps led
| Driver | Kevin Harvick | Stewart–Haas Racing |
- Laps: 214

Winner
| No. 78 | Martin Truex Jr. | Furniture Row Racing |

Television in the United States
- Network: NBC
- Announcers: Rick Allen, Jeff Burton and Steve Letarte; Ken Squier, Ned Jarrett, and Dale Jarrett
- Nielsen ratings: 2.6/5 (Overnight); 2.8/6 (Final); 4.6 million viewers

Radio in the United States
- Radio: MRN
- Booth announcers: Joe Moore, Jeff Striegle and Rusty Wallace
- Turn announcers: Dave Moody (1 & 2) and Mike Bagley (3 & 4)

The 2016 Bojangles' Southern 500, the 67th running of the event, was a NASCAR Sprint Cup Series stock car race that was held on September 4, 2016, at Darlington Raceway in Darlington, South Carolina. Contested over 367 laps on the 1.366-mile (2.198 km) egg-shaped oval, it was the 25th race of the 2016 NASCAR Sprint Cup Series season. Furniture Row Racing's Martin Truex Jr. won the race by holding off Kevin Harvick to earn his second victory of the 2016 season.

Brad Keselowski made his way to a second-place finish, The race had eight lead changes among different drivers and ten cautions for 52 laps.

== Entry list ==
The preliminary entry list for the race included 40 cars and was released on August 27, 2016, at 1:52 p.m. Eastern time.

| No. | Driver | Team | Manufacturer | Throwback |
|---|---|---|---|---|
| 1 | Jamie McMurray | Chip Ganassi Racing | Chevrolet | Bill Elliott's No. 94 Mac Tonight paint scheme from 1997 |
| 2 | Brad Keselowski | Team Penske | Ford | 1972 Miller Lite design |
| 3 | Austin Dillon | Richard Childress Racing | Chevrolet | Ricky Rudd's 1983 car when he won RCR's first Cup race |
| 4 | Kevin Harvick | Stewart–Haas Racing | Chevrolet | Cale Yarborough's 1979 Daytona 500 car |
| 5 | Kasey Kahne | Hendrick Motorsports | Chevrolet | Terry Labonte's 1982 car |
| 6 | Trevor Bayne | Roush Fenway Racing | Ford | Mark Martin's 1996–1997 car |
| 7 | Regan Smith | Tommy Baldwin Racing | Chevrolet | Alan Kulwicki's 1992 car |
| 10 | Danica Patrick | Stewart–Haas Racing | Chevrolet | Retro-inspired Nature's Bakery car |
| 11 | Denny Hamlin | Joe Gibbs Racing | Toyota | Darrell Waltrip-inspired car |
| 13 | Casey Mears | Germain Racing | Chevrolet | Smokey Yunick's car that was driven by Mario Andretti and Curtis Turner in 1966 and 1967 |
| 14 | Tony Stewart | Stewart–Haas Racing | Chevrolet | Bobby Allison's Coca-Cola car in 1971 and 1972 |
| 15 | Clint Bowyer | HScott Motorsports | Chevrolet | Benny Parsons' 1973 championship-winning car |
| 16 | Greg Biffle | Roush Fenway Racing | Ford | Alan Kulwicki's 1992 Hooters car |
| 17 | Ricky Stenhouse Jr. | Roush Fenway Racing | Ford | Darrell Waltrip's car when he won his first Cup race in 1975 |
| 18 | Kyle Busch | Joe Gibbs Racing | Toyota | Dale Jarrett's 1993 car |
| 19 | Carl Edwards | Joe Gibbs Racing | Toyota | Tony Stewart's 1999 car when he drove for JGR |
| 20 | Matt Kenseth | Joe Gibbs Racing | Toyota | Tide-sponsored car, inspired by Darrell Waltrip's 1989 Daytona 500 and Ricky Craven's 2003 Carolina Dodge Dealers 400-winning cars |
| 21 | Ryan Blaney (R) | Wood Brothers Racing | Ford | David Pearson's 1976 car |
| 22 | Joey Logano | Team Penske | Ford | Bobby Labonte's 1998 Busch Series car, the first time Shell had sponsored a car |
| 23 | David Ragan | BK Racing | Toyota | Dr Pepper car with its "I'm a Pepper" slogan |
| 24 | Chase Elliott (R) | Hendrick Motorsports | Chevrolet | NAPA Auto Parts delivery trucks in the 1960s |
| 27 | Paul Menard | Richard Childress Racing | Chevrolet | The original paint scheme for Al Unser Jr.'s car at the 1993 Daytona 500 before crashing in his qualifying race |
| 30 | Josh Wise | The Motorsports Group | Chevrolet | Dale Earnhardt's No. 30 Army car from 1976 |
| 31 | Ryan Newman | Richard Childress Racing | Chevrolet | Ricky Rudd's 1983 car when he won RCR's first Cup race |
| 32 | Jeffrey Earnhardt (R) | Go FAS Racing | Ford | Dale Earnhardt's Wrangler car from the 1980s |
| 34 | Chris Buescher (R) | Front Row Motorsports | Ford | Inspired by the first Love's Travel Stop opened in 1981 |
| 38 | Landon Cassill | Front Row Motorsports | Ford | J. D. McDuffie-inspired car |
| 41 | Kurt Busch | Stewart–Haas Racing | Chevrolet | The VF-1, Haas Automation's first CNC machine |
| 42 | Kyle Larson | Chip Ganassi Racing | Chevrolet | Eddie Cheever's 1990 IndyCar scheme, the first motorsports sponsorship for Target Corporation |
| 43 | Aric Almirola | Richard Petty Motorsports | Ford | Richard Petty's 1979 Daytona 500-winning car |
| 44 | Brian Scott (R) | Richard Petty Motorsports | Ford | N/A |
| 46 | Michael Annett | HScott Motorsports | Chevrolet | Current paint scheme with 1970s Pilot Flying J logos |
| 47 | A. J. Allmendinger | JTG Daugherty Racing | Chevrolet | Bruce Hill's 1977 car |
| 48 | Jimmie Johnson | Hendrick Motorsports | Chevrolet | Dale Earnhardt's 1979 car driven by David Pearson as a substitute driver |
| 55 | Reed Sorenson | Premium Motorsports | Chevrolet | N/A |
| 78 | Martin Truex Jr. | Furniture Row Racing | Toyota | Auto-Owners Insurance 100th anniversary scheme |
| 83 | Matt DiBenedetto | BK Racing | Toyota | 1970s Orange Crush design |
| 88 | Jeff Gordon | Hendrick Motorsports | Chevrolet | Buddy Baker's "Gray Ghost" car from 1979 and 1980 |
| 95 | Michael McDowell | Circle Sport – Leavine Family Racing | Chevrolet | Richard Childress' 1970s car |
| 98 | Cole Whitt | Premium Motorsports | Chevrolet | LeeRoy Yarbrough's 1969 Daytona 500 and Southern 500 winning car |
Official entry list

== Qualifying ==
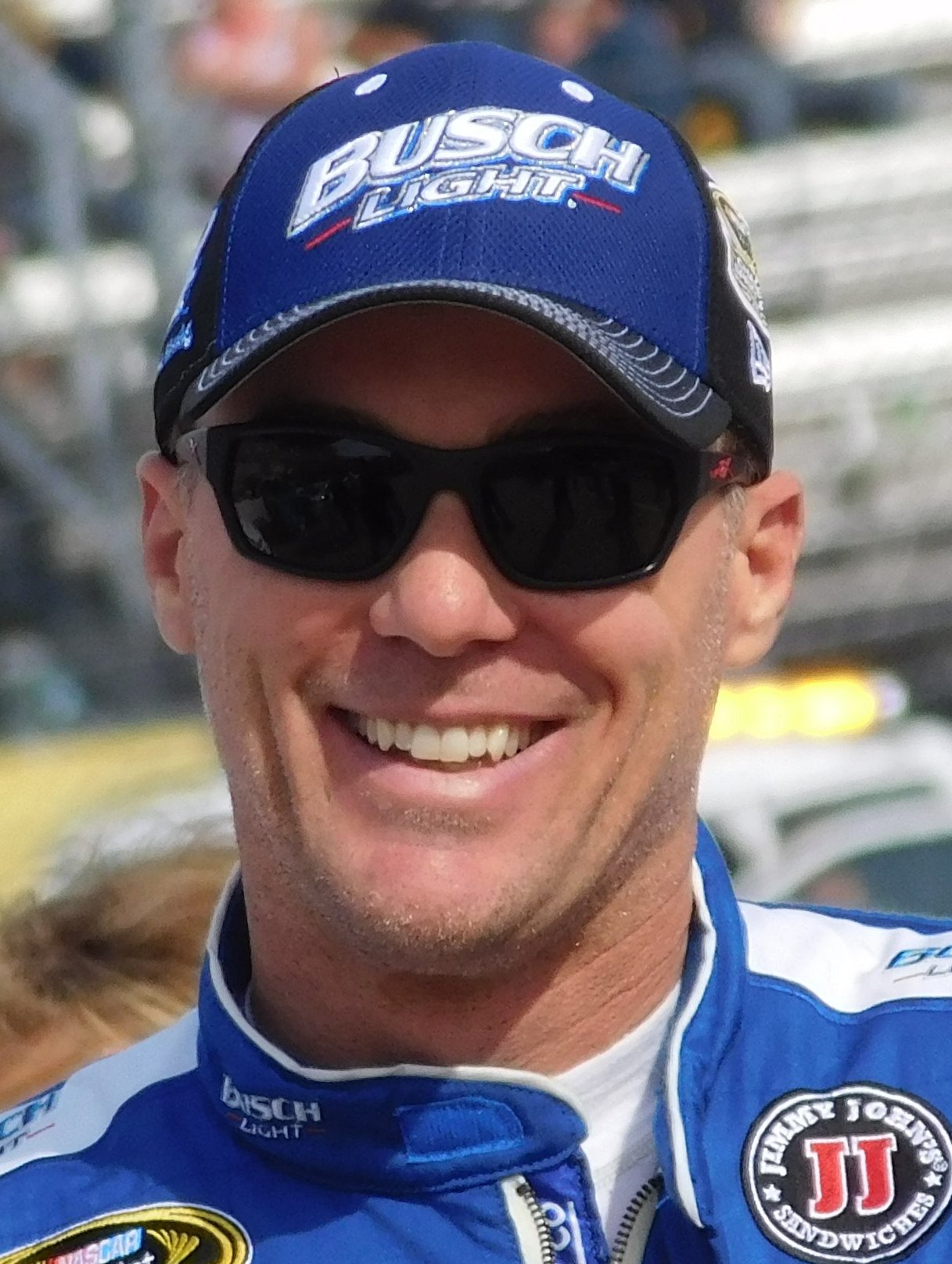
Kevin Harvick won the pole.

NASCAR cancelled all Friday activities and rescheduled both practice sessions in place of qualifying for Saturday due to rain from Hurricane Hermine. Kevin Harvick was awarded the pole position as a result.

=== Starting lineup ===
| Pos | No. | Driver | Team | Manufacturer |
|---|---|---|---|---|
| 1 | 4 | Kevin Harvick | Stewart–Haas Racing | Chevrolet |
| 2 | 2 | Brad Keselowski | Team Penske | Ford |
| 3 | 19 | Carl Edwards | Joe Gibbs Racing | Toyota |
| 4 | 41 | Kurt Busch | Stewart–Haas Racing | Chevrolet |
| 5 | 22 | Joey Logano | Team Penske | Ford |
| 6 | 18 | Kyle Busch | Joe Gibbs Racing | Toyota |
| 7 | 11 | Denny Hamlin | Joe Gibbs Racing | Toyota |
| 8 | 78 | Martin Truex Jr. | Furniture Row Racing | Toyota |
| 9 | 48 | Jimmie Johnson | Hendrick Motorsports | Chevrolet |
| 10 | 20 | Matt Kenseth | Joe Gibbs Racing | Toyota |
| 11 | 24 | Chase Elliott (R) | Hendrick Motorsports | Chevrolet |
| 12 | 3 | Austin Dillon | Richard Childress Racing | Chevrolet |
| 13 | 1 | Jamie McMurray | Chip Ganassi Racing | Chevrolet |
| 14 | 31 | Ryan Newman | Richard Childress Racing | Chevrolet |
| 15 | 88 | Jeff Gordon | Hendrick Motorsports | Chevrolet |
| 16 | 42 | Kyle Larson | Chip Ganassi Racing | Chevrolet |
| 17 | 14 | Tony Stewart | Stewart–Haas Racing | Chevrolet |
| 18 | 5 | Kasey Kahne | Hendrick Motorsports | Chevrolet |
| 19 | 6 | Trevor Bayne | Roush Fenway Racing | Ford |
| 20 | 21 | Ryan Blaney (R) | Wood Brothers Racing | Ford |
| 21 | 47 | A. J. Allmendinger | JTG Daugherty Racing | Chevrolet |
| 22 | 17 | Ricky Stenhouse Jr. | Roush Fenway Racing | Ford |
| 23 | 16 | Greg Biffle | Roush Fenway Racing | Ford |
| 24 | 27 | Paul Menard | Richard Childress Racing | Chevrolet |
| 25 | 10 | Danica Patrick | Stewart–Haas Racing | Chevrolet |
| 26 | 43 | Aric Almirola | Richard Petty Motorsports | Ford |
| 27 | 15 | Clint Bowyer | HScott Motorsports | Chevrolet |
| 28 | 13 | Casey Mears | Germain Racing | Chevrolet |
| 29 | 38 | Landon Cassill | Front Row Motorsports | Ford |
| 30 | 95 | Michael McDowell | Circle Sport – Leavine Family Racing | Chevrolet |
| 31 | 34 | Chris Buescher (R) | Front Row Motorsports | Ford |
| 32 | 23 | David Ragan | BK Racing | Toyota |
| 33 | 7 | Regan Smith | Tommy Baldwin Racing | Chevrolet |
| 34 | 44 | Brian Scott (R) | Richard Petty Motorsports | Ford |
| 35 | 83 | Matt DiBenedetto | BK Racing | Toyota |
| 36 | 98 | Cole Whitt | Premium Motorsports | Chevrolet |
| 37 | 46 | Michael Annett | HScott Motorsports | Chevrolet |
| 38 | 32 | Jeffrey Earnhardt (R) | Go FAS Racing | Ford |
| 39 | 55 | Reed Sorenson | Premium Motorsports | Chevrolet |
| 40 | 30 | Josh Wise | The Motorsports Group | Chevrolet |
Official starting lineup

== Practice ==
=== First practice ===
Jimmie Johnson was the fastest in the first practice session with a time of 27.937 and a speed of 176.025 mph (283.285 km/h).

| Pos | No. | Driver | Team | Manufacturer | Time | Speed |
|---|---|---|---|---|---|---|
| 1 | 48 | Jimmie Johnson | Hendrick Motorsports | Chevrolet | 27.937 | 176.025 |
| 2 | 11 | Denny Hamlin | Joe Gibbs Racing | Toyota | 28.091 | 175.060 |
| 3 | 21 | Ryan Blaney (R) | Wood Brothers Racing | Ford | 28.147 | 174.711 |
Official first practice results

=== Final practice ===
Brad Keselowski was the fastest in the final practice session with a time of 28.157 and a speed of 174.649 mph (281.070 km/h).

| Pos | No. | Driver | Team | Manufacturer | Time | Speed |
|---|---|---|---|---|---|---|
| 1 | 2 | Brad Keselowski | Team Penske | Chevrolet | 28.157 | 174.649 |
| 2 | 41 | Kurt Busch | Stewart–Haas Racing | Chevrolet | 28.257 | 174.031 |
| 3 | 48 | Jimmie Johnson | Hendrick Motorsports | Chevrolet | 28.259 | 174.019 |
Official final practice results

== Race ==
=== First half ===
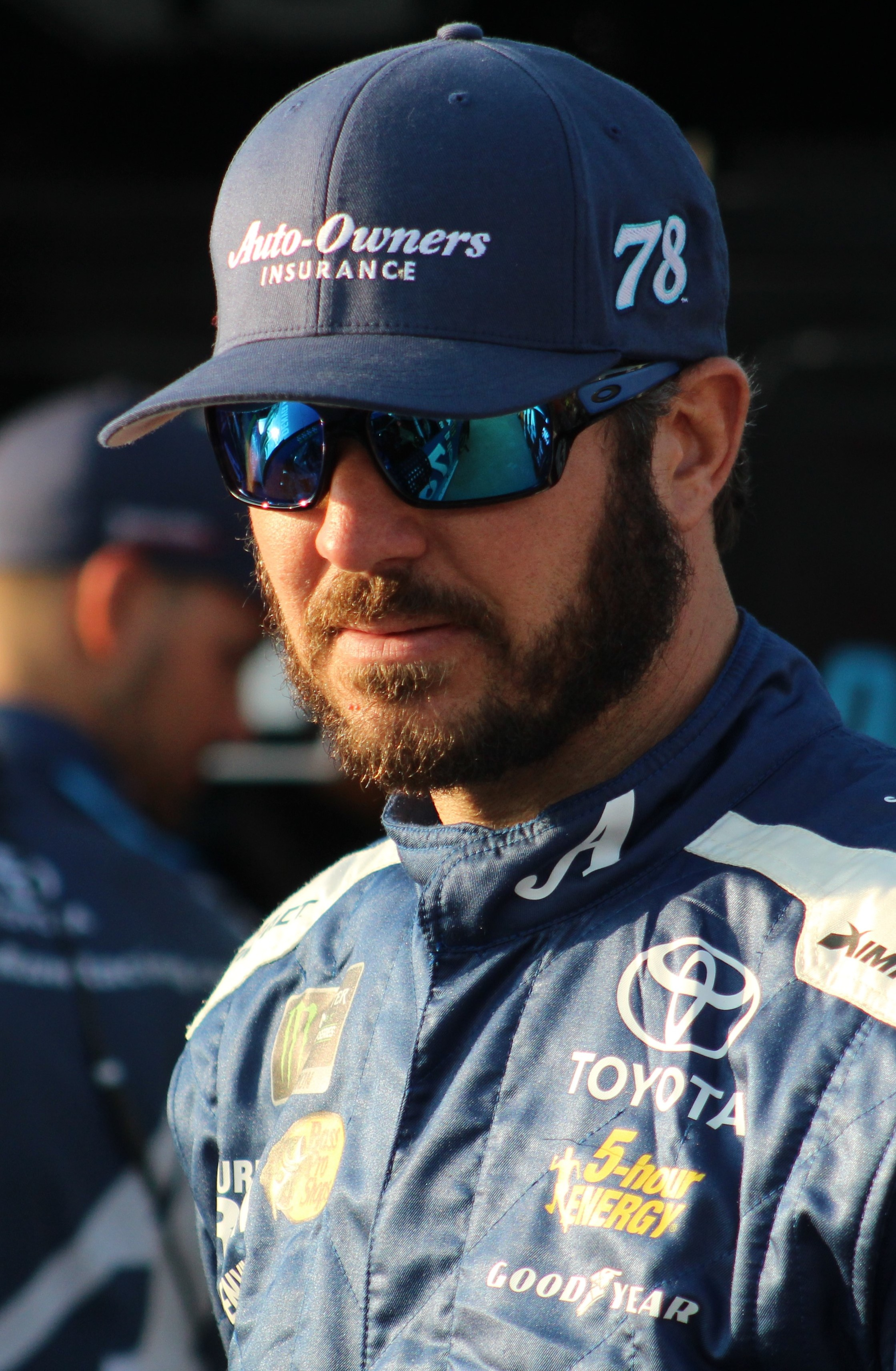
Martin Truex Jr. won the race.

Under mostly sunny South Carolina skies, Kevin Harvick led the field to the green flag at 6:26 p.m. Not much happened during this first run of the race outside of Clint Bowyer making an unscheduled stop for a flat tire on lap 23. Kyle Larson started a cycle of green flag stops on lap 47. Harvick retained the lead through the pit cycle. Austin Dillon and Michael McDowell were black-flagged for speeding and forced to serve a pass through penalty.

It was the same routine the next run of riding around the track until the second round of stops on lap 92. This time, Brad Keselowski assumed the lead when Harvick pitted. Trevor Bayne spun out at the entrance of pit road and brought out the first caution of the race on lap 96. This trapped all but Keselowski, Chase Elliott and Ricky Stenhouse Jr. a lap or more down. Everyone opted to take the wave-around when the top-three pitted.

The race restarted on lap 103. Jimmie Johnson, who was black-flagged before the caution flew for "illegal body modification," was forced to serve a pass through penalty. The second caution of the race flew on lap 114 after Brian Scott got loose exiting turn 2 and spun out.

The race restarted on lap 118. Keselowski drove away from the field for a time, but was chased down by Harvick who passed him in turn 2 to retake the lead on lap 141. A number of cars started pitting on lap 162. Harvick was among them and Keselowski assumed the lead. He pitted the next lap and the lead cycled back to Harvick.

The third caution of the race flew on lap 204 for a single-car wreck on the backstretch. Exiting turn 2, Tony Stewart got alongside Scott and his car got loose. After he recovered his car, he veered back to the right, hooked Scott and sent him into the inside wall. "We were just in a bad situation ... I was trying to let Tony go," Scott said. "Apparently he got mad at me. I have a lot of respect for Tony. He's always raced me really clean. I am not sure what he thought was going on there. I am not sure if he thought I was trying to hold him up there, I wasn’t. I was trying to let him go. I even pointed him to the inside. Maybe he thought I was giving him the finger or something. I will talk with him. We will figure it out.” Stewart was called to the NASCAR hauler after the race for the incident. He denied intentionally wrecking him, saying afterwards that he was "on old tires and sliding around. I got underneath him in [Turn] 2 and for some reason, he ran us through there [beside us] and I got really loose, and I was still getting it gathered up and got him in the left rear and wrecked him."

=== Second half ===
The race restarted on lap 211. The fourth caution of the race flew on lap 213 after Johnson got loose exiting turn 4, spun down the track and hit the inside wall on the frontstretch.

The race restarted on lap 218. The fifth caution of the race flew on lap 249 after Jeffrey Earnhardt slammed the wall in turn 4. Denny Hamlin exited pit road with the race lead.

The race restarted on lap 255. The sixth caution of the race flew on lap 260 for Greg Biffle hitting the wall in turn 4. Matt Kenseth opted not to pit under the caution and assumed the race lead.

The race restarted on lap 265. Harvick drove by Kenseth to retake the lead with 94 laps to go. The seventh caution of the race flew with 87 laps to go for a two-car wreck in turn 2 involving A. J. Allmendinger and Ryan Blaney. Hamlin exited pit road with the race lead.

The race restarted with 83 laps to go. Larson got a great restart and took the lead from Hamlin with 82 laps to go. Oil left on the track that came from the expired engine of Stewart's No. 14 car brought out the eighth caution of the race with 48 laps to go.

The race restarted with 45 laps to go. The ninth caution of the race flew with 39 laps to go for a two-car wreck on the backstretch. Rounding turn 2, Paul Menard suffered a left-rear tire blowout, got loose, clipped Kurt Busch and sent him backwards into the wall. He continued down the track hitting the inside wall head on. Ryan Newman opted not to pit and assumed the lead along with Brad Keselowski who also stayed out.

The race restarted with 34 laps to go. Martin Truex Jr. passed Newman for the lead with 27 laps to go. Harvick reeled him in to take the lead just as the 10th caution of the race flew for a two-car wreck in turn 2 involving Aric Almirola and Bowyer. Truex exited pit road with the race lead.

The race restarted with 12 laps to go. Truex drove on to score the victory.

== Post-race ==
=== Driver comment ===
Truex said in victory lane that the win was "just – this is unbelievable. So many people to thank obviously. ... I appreciate them.”

After a series of bad pit stops relegated Harvick, who led a race high of 214 laps, to a runner-up finish, he said that he lost the race because of "the same old thing. You get into position where you bring a dominant car. The guys in the shop and the guys in the garage are doing a great job. The guys on pit road are doing a terrible job. You get into position to win races and they continually step on their toes and don’t make it happen.’’ During his post-race media availability, he went further saying he's "over being a cheerleader. Those guys get paid a lot of money to perform on pit road and cheerleading hasn't really been working. You've got to get after it on pit road and do your job.”

=== Penalties ===
On the Wednesday following the race, Larson and Newman – whose cars failed post-race inspection – were docked 15 points each, and their crew chiefs were both fined over $20,000.

== Race results ==
| Pos | No. | Driver | Team | Manufacturer | Laps | Points |
|---|---|---|---|---|---|---|
| 1 | 78 | Martin Truex Jr. | Furniture Row Racing | Toyota | 367 | 44 |
| 2 | 4 | Kevin Harvick | Stewart–Haas Racing | Chevrolet | 367 | 41 |
| 3 | 42 | Kyle Larson | Chip Ganassi Racing | Chevrolet | 367 | 24 |
| 4 | 11 | Denny Hamlin | Joe Gibbs Racing | Toyota | 367 | 38 |
| 5 | 22 | Joey Logano | Team Penske | Ford | 367 | 36 |
| 6 | 20 | Matt Kenseth | Joe Gibbs Racing | Toyota | 367 | 36 |
| 7 | 5 | Kasey Kahne | Hendrick Motorsports | Chevrolet | 367 | 34 |
| 8 | 31 | Ryan Newman | Richard Childress Racing | Chevrolet | 367 | 19 |
| 9 | 2 | Brad Keselowski | Team Penske | Ford | 367 | 33 |
| 10 | 24 | Chase Elliott (R) | Hendrick Motorsports | Chevrolet | 367 | 31 |
| 11 | 18 | Kyle Busch | Joe Gibbs Racing | Toyota | 367 | 31 |
| 12 | 3 | Austin Dillon | Richard Childress Racing | Chevrolet | 367 | 29 |
| 13 | 21 | Ryan Blaney (R) | Wood Brothers Racing | Ford | 367 | 28 |
| 14 | 88 | Jeff Gordon | Hendrick Motorsports | Chevrolet | 367 | 27 |
| 15 | 1 | Jamie McMurray | Chip Ganassi Racing | Chevrolet | 367 | 26 |
| 16 | 27 | Paul Menard | Richard Childress Racing | Chevrolet | 367 | 25 |
| 17 | 34 | Chris Buescher (R) | Front Row Motorsports | Ford | 367 | 24 |
| 18 | 17 | Ricky Stenhouse Jr. | Roush Fenway Racing | Ford | 367 | 23 |
| 19 | 19 | Carl Edwards | Joe Gibbs Racing | Toyota | 366 | 22 |
| 20 | 7 | Regan Smith | Tommy Baldwin Racing | Chevrolet | 366 | 21 |
| 21 | 23 | David Ragan | BK Racing | Toyota | 366 | 20 |
| 22 | 15 | Clint Bowyer | HScott Motorsports | Chevrolet | 365 | 19 |
| 23 | 47 | A. J. Allmendinger | JTG Daugherty Racing | Chevrolet | 365 | 18 |
| 24 | 10 | Danica Patrick | Stewart–Haas Racing | Chevrolet | 365 | 17 |
| 25 | 13 | Casey Mears | Germain Racing | Chevrolet | 365 | 16 |
| 26 | 83 | Matt DiBenedetto | BK Racing | Toyota | 365 | 15 |
| 27 | 95 | Michael McDowell | Circle Sport – Leavine Family Racing | Chevrolet | 364 | 14 |
| 28 | 46 | Michael Annett | HScott Motorsports | Chevrolet | 362 | 13 |
| 29 | 30 | Josh Wise | The Motorsports Group | Chevrolet | 361 | 12 |
| 30 | 38 | Landon Cassill | Front Row Motorsports | Ford | 361 | 11 |
| 31 | 55 | Reed Sorenson | Premium Motorsports | Chevrolet | 358 | 10 |
| 32 | 43 | Aric Almirola | Richard Petty Motorsports | Ford | 346 | 9 |
| 33 | 48 | Jimmie Johnson | Hendrick Motorsports | Chevrolet | 328 | 8 |
| 34 | 41 | Kurt Busch | Stewart–Haas Racing | Chevrolet | 326 | 7 |
| 35 | 14 | Tony Stewart | Stewart–Haas Racing | Chevrolet | 317 | 6 |
| 36 | 16 | Greg Biffle | Roush Fenway Racing | Ford | 295 | 5 |
| 37 | 98 | Cole Whitt | Premium Motorsports | Chevrolet | 250 | 4 |
| 38 | 32 | Jeffrey Earnhardt (R) | Go FAS Racing | Ford | 247 | 3 |
| 39 | 44 | Brian Scott (R) | Richard Petty Motorsports | Ford | 199 | 2 |
| 40 | 6 | Trevor Bayne | Roush Fenway Racing | Ford | 161 | 1 |
Official race results

=== Race summary ===
- Lead changes: 8 among different drivers
- Cautions/Laps: 10 for 52
- Red flags: 0
- Time of race: 3 hours, 57 minutes and 54 seconds
- Average speed: 126.437 miles per hour (203.481 km/h)

== Media ==
=== Television ===
NBC Sports covered the race on the television side. Rick Allen, two–time Darlington winner Jeff Burton and Steve Letarte had the call in the booth for the race. As part of the throwback weekend, Ken Squier, Ned Jarrett and Dale Jarrett also called a portion of the race. Dave Burns, Mike Massaro, Marty Snider and Kelli Stavast handled pit road on the television side.

NBC
| Booth announcers | Pit reporters |
|---|---|
| Lap-by-lap: Rick Allen and Ken Squier; Color-commentator: Jeff Burton and Ned Jarrett; Color-commentator: Steve Letarte and Dale Jarrett | Dave Burns; Mike Massaro; Marty Snider; Kelli Stavast |

=== Radio ===
The Motor Racing Network had the radio call for the race, which was simulcasted on Sirius XM NASCAR Radio. Dave Moody called the race from a Billboard outside of turn when the field raced through turns 1 and 2, and Mike Bagley had the call of the race atop of the Darlington Raceway Club outside of turn 3 when the field raced through turns 3 and 4

MRN
| Booth announcers | Turn announcers | Pit reporters |
|---|---|---|
| Lead announcer: Joe Moore; Announcer: Jeff Striegle; Announcer: Rusty Wallace | Turns 1 & 2: Dave Moody; Turns 3 & 4: Mike Bagley | Alex Hayden; Winston Kelley; Steve Post |

== Standings after the race ==
Drivers' Championship standings
| | Pos | Manufacturer | Points |
|---|---|---|---|
| | 1 | Kevin Harvick | 840 |
| | 2 | Brad Keselowski | 797 (–43) |
| 2 | 3 | Joey Logano | 752 (–88) |
| 1 | 4 | Carl Edwards | 746 (–94) |
| 2 | 5 | Denny Hamlin | 729 (–111) |
| 2 | 6 | Kurt Busch | 728 (–112) |
| 1 | 7 | Kyle Busch | 727 (–113) |
| | 8 | Martin Truex Jr. | 696 (–144) |
| 1 | 9 | Matt Kenseth | 669 (–171) |
| 1 | 10 | Chase Elliott | 659 (–181) |
| 2 | 11 | Jimmie Johnson | 656 (–184) |
| | 12 | Austin Dillon | 651 (–189) |
| | 13 | Jamie McMurray | 642 (–198) |
| | 14 | Ryan Newman | 620 (–220) |
| | 15 | Kyle Larson | 606 (–234) |
| | 16 | Kasey Kahne | 598 (–242) |
Official driver's standings

Manufacturers' Championship standings
| Pos | Manufacturer | Points |
|---|---|---|
| 1 | Toyota | 1,028 |
| 2 | Chevrolet | 1,005 (–23) |
| 3 | Ford | 957 (–71) |
Official manufacturers' standings

- Note: Only the first 16 positions are included for the driver standings.
  . – Driver has clinched a position in the Chase for the Sprint Cup.

| Previous race: 2016 Pure Michigan 400 | Sprint Cup Series; 2016 season | Next race: 2016 Federated Auto Parts 400 |
