= The Shivers =

The Shivers may refer to:

- The Shivers (Austin, Texas), alt-country band formed 1988
- The Shivers (New York City), rock, folk and soul band formed 2001
