= Mac Tonight =

McDonald's advertising character

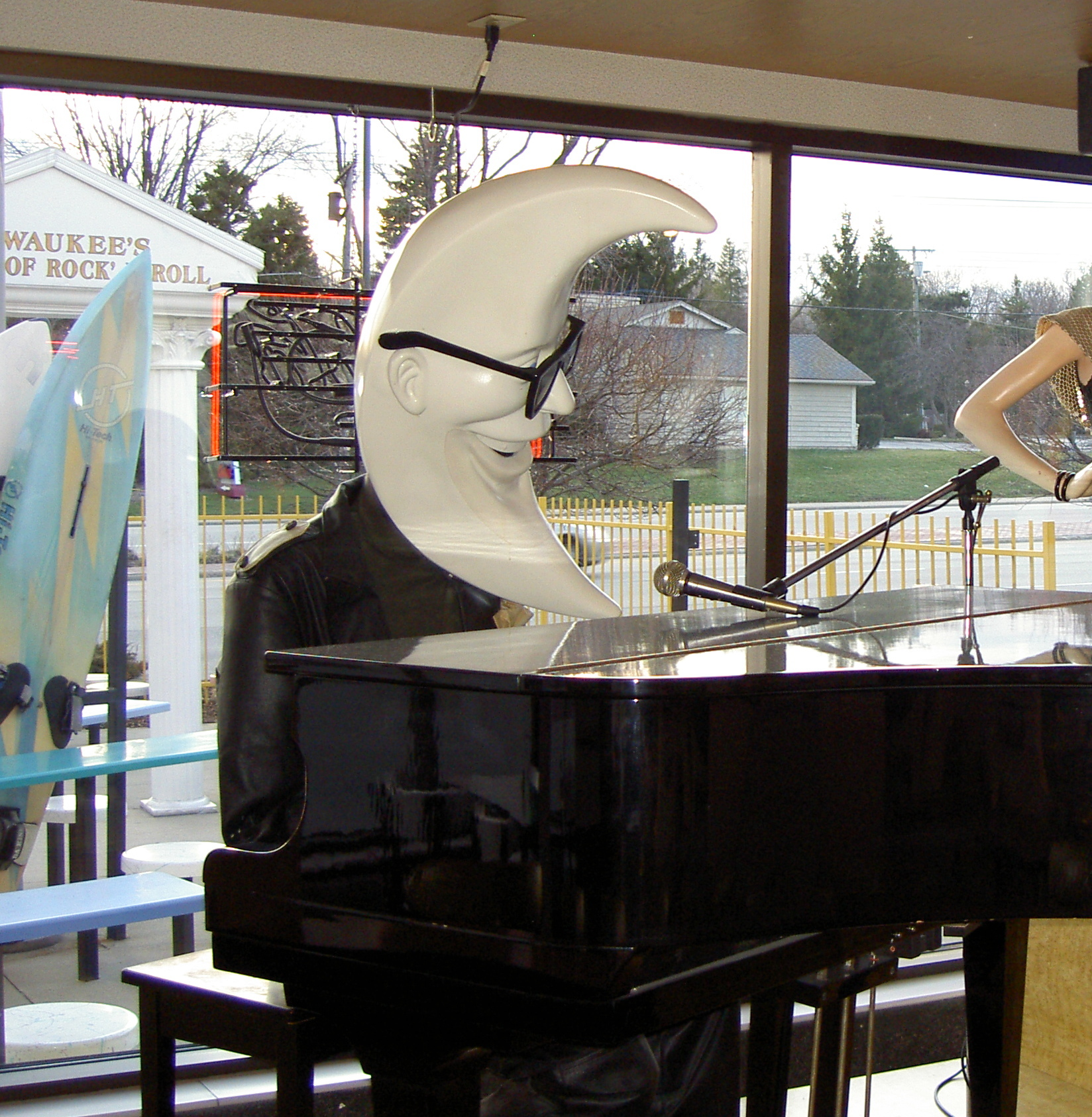
- This animatronic installation was at Solid Gold McDonald's in Greenfield, Wisconsin (April 2006).
- First appearance: 1986
- Created by: Davis, Johnson, Mogul & Colombatto
- Portrayed by: Doug Jones (1986–1997)
- Voiced by: Brock Walsh (1986–1990) Eason Chan (2007–2010) Sharizan Borhan (2007)

In-universe information
- Gender: Male
- Occupation: Nighttime mascot for McDonald's

Mac Tonight is a character used in a marketing campaign for McDonald's restaurants from the late 1980s to the 2000s. The character was known for his giant crescent moon head, sunglasses, piano playing, and crooner parody of "Mack the Knife", which was made famous in the United States by Bobby Darin. The original campaign's Mac was performed by actor Doug Jones and voiced by Brock Walsh.

The campaign was conceived in 1986 as a local promotion to increase dinner sales for Southern California licensees, and its popularity prompted a nationwide campaign in 1987. In 1989, Bobby Darin's son, Dodd Mitchell Darin, filed a lawsuit against McDonald's for allegedly infringing upon his father's trademark, causing McDonald's to stop using the song and mostly retiring the campaign. None of the several 1990s reboot attempts were successful, including a NASCAR sponsorship in the late 1990s. A separate animated campaign featuring the character was launched in Southeast Asia in 2007.

In the late 2000s, the character was appropriated as "Moon Man", an Internet meme that became associated with white supremacy and the alt-right and was designated a hate symbol by the Anti-Defamation League. In the 2010s, the character's image became an icon in the vaporwave music genre.

== History ==
=== Original campaign (1986–1989) ===
The campaign, created by Jim Benedict and Peter Coutroulis, was created for Southern California McDonald's franchisees by Los Angeles advertising firm Davis, Johnson, Mogul & Colombatto, for a budget of around US$500,000 (equivalent to about $1,500,000 in 2025). Looking to increase the dinner business, the agency was inspired by the song "Mack the Knife" by Kurt Weill and Bertolt Brecht, made famous in the United States by Bobby Darin in 1959. The agency listened to different versions of it before opting to create an original version with new lyrics. After deciding not to feature real people, the designers settled on an anthropomorphic crooner moon with a man's body wearing 1950s-style sunglasses, playing a grand piano atop either a floating cloud or a giant version of the namesake Big Mac sandwich. The song and style were designed to appeal to baby boomers as a revival of 1950s-style music in popular culture, and to garner a cult following akin to Max Headroom.

From 1986 to 1987, the campaign expanded to other cities on the American West Coast. McDonald's said that the campaign had "great success", while trade magazine Nation's Restaurant News announced that it had contributed to increases of over 10% in dinnertime business at some Californian restaurants. A crowd of 1,500 attended the visit of a costumed character to a Los Angeles McDonald's. With concerns that he was too typical of the West Coast, in February 1987, it was decided that the character would feature on national advertisements, which aired that September. He attracted a crowd of 1,000 in Boca Raton, Florida. A September 1987 survey by Ad Watch found that the number of consumers who recalled McDonald's advertising before any other doubled from the previous month, and was higher than any company since the New Coke launch in 1985.

Doug Jones performed Mac Tonight for 27 out of the 29 commercials from 1986 to 1997, and Mac Tonight's voice was provided by Brock Walsh. In 2013, Jones recalled "that's when my career took a turn that I was not expecting. I didn't know that was a career option." Director Peter Coutroulis, who had won a Clio Award for a previous campaign for Borax, pitched several advertisements which did not air, including a "Spielberg-like" production inspired by E.T., in which two astronomers watch Mac Tonight drive his Cadillac through the sky.

In 1989, Bobby Darin's son Dodd Mitchell Darin alleged that the song infringed upon his father's trademark without prior permission. Darin filed both a lawsuit and an injunction for the song to be removed from both TV and radio ads. As a response to the lawsuit, McDonald's stopped airing the advertisements.

=== Later appearances ===
Mac Tonight was brought back by McDonald's in the 1990s, but with limited success. He appeared in a 1996 ad that aired in the West Coast, and between 1997 and 1998, McDonald's sponsored NASCAR Hall of Famer Bill Elliott, featuring Mac Tonight on his car.

In 2006, McDonald's brought back the character in territories throughout Southeast Asia and Asia-Pacific Region such as in Singapore, Malaysia, Indonesia, Philippines, Hong Kong, Taiwan, Thailand, and China. The Asian-exclusive campaign featured an animated Mac Tonight dancing atop a McDonald's restaurant while singing and playing a saxophone. These ads were made by Liquid Animation. The "Mac Tonight Mad Dash" competition, where 24 pairs of contestants had to race to visit McDonald's locations to solve puzzles, was hosted on July 24, 2007, and broadcast in the Philippines.

== Production ==
The mask was made by a makeup and practical effects artist called Steve Neill. It weighed over 10 pounds (4.5 kg), with facial expressions motorized by animatronics. Three puppeteers controlled the lip, jaw, and eyebrow movement. New masks were made with more articulation and animatronics. The Australian 1988 mask was made by Robert Bertie.

Hydraulically powered animatronic figures were built by Mannetron, and deployed into several McDonald's restaurants in the early 1990s. with the character playing a piano. One location was a Wisconsin restaurant known as the Solid Gold McDonald's, prior to major renovations in 2011. One of the animatronics was in the World's Largest Entertainment McDonald's in Orlando, Florida.

== Legacy ==
Mac Tonight has a heavy association with vaporwave and appeared on the cover of the split album Late Night Delight by Saint Pepsi and Luxury Elite, where he became an icon of the genre. In 2016, the Mac Tonight theme was McDonald's driver Jamie McMurray's Chip Ganassi Racing No. 1 Chevrolet SS throwback scheme for Darlington Raceway's Southern 500. Ronald McDonald House Charities started the annual Mac Tonight Gala fundraiser, which was renamed Masquerade Ball in 2018.

=== Moon Man ===
Moon Man is an Internet meme and unofficial parody of Mac Tonight that originated in 2007 on the Internet meme community YTMND, in which the character is depicted as being a white supremacist. The meme, which was initially satirical, gained attraction with user generated parody songs made on the site and was further popularized on 4chan and 8chan in 2015. Moon Man songs are parodies of mainstream songs with extremely racist and violent lyrics, bearing themes like white supremacy, race war, antisemitism, mass shooting, homophobia and misogyny. A Salon article compared Moon Man to Pepe the Frog, another meme reappropriated as a hate symbol. In 2015, a mod for the video game Doom was created, featuring Moon Man as the playable character and racist stereotypes of black, Jewish, and Hispanic people as enemies.

By 2016, YouTube was removing Moon Man videos for violating its community guidelines on hate speech, and AT&T modified its text-to-speech software which had been used to create the songs, to filter out the character's name and obscenities. In 2019, the Anti-Defamation League added Moon Man to its database of hate symbols. In 2022, Mac Tonight co-creator Peter Cotroulis said that he would "love to bring Mac back" but that "with how he's been twisted in recent years, I don't think that will ever happen now". On the other hand, Infostormer, a neo-Nazi website, defended the Moon Man character, describing him as "tired of political correctness", but denied supporting the lyrics of his songs.

On October 2, 2025, the Department of Homeland Security (DHS) posted a montage video captioned "the future is bright", with a brief clip of Mac Tonight. Talking Points Memo alleged that the use of the clip references the racist Moon Man meme. A DHS spokesperson denied the connection to the meme, commenting that "Loving hot, tasty, McDonald's does not make you a Nazi."
