= Krool Toys =

American game studio (2020–2025)

- Company type: Private
- Industry: Video games
- Founded: 2020
- Founders: Stefan Cohen, Tia Chinai
- Defunct: 2025
- Headquarters: United States
- Products: Video games, branded merchandise

Krool Toys was an American indie game studio founded by Tia Chinai and Stefan Cohen. Some of their clients included Nike, McDonald's, and Warner Music Group. On September 2, 2025, the studio announced they would be closing.

== History ==
Krool Toys was founded in 2020 by Stefan Cohen and Tia Chinai. Originally concentrating on music marketing campaigns by creating custom video games, toys and other collectables for musicians, they have expanded to working with multinational fast food retailers, fashion brands, as well as releasing their own collection of branded merchandise.

Following collaborations with Cactus Plant Flea Market, Travis Scott, BTS, and others, on June 12, 2023, McDonald's announced its latest campaign, the Grimace Shake, in celebration of Grimace's Birthday. McDonald's worked with Krool Toys to develop Grimace's Birthday, a platformer inspired by Game Boy Color titles. In the game, the player controls Grimace as they skate through tunnels, grind on handrails, balance on telephone wires, and float over the New York City skyline to find his McDonaldland friends. Tariq Hassan, chief marketing and customer experience officer at McDonald's, stated that "Grimace is the perfect lovable icon to have McDonald's meet our fans at the intersection of nostalgia and culture." Grimace's Birthday drew widespread attention from both gaming and fast food communities.

In 2024, Krool Toys collaborated with Air Jordan to create “Cosmic Climb,” an 8-bit video game inspired by the Air Jordan 11 Retro Low. The game was released on the SNKRS app as part of the Air Jordan 11 Retro Low “Black/Varsity Royal” campaign, with Krool Toys founders Tia Chinai and Stefan Cohen featured as playable characters. This campaign marked Air Jordan as the studio’s final major client before its closure in 2025.

On September 2, 2025, it was announced via Instagram that the studio would be closing down, with their website updated to reflect the post. Following the closure of Krool Toys, co‑founder Stefan Cohen started Bughouse, a Brooklyn-based game and creative technology studio and experiential marketing agency that makes custom games and interactive activations for films and brands, including a collaboration with A24.
