= Shamrock Shake =

Milkshake sold by McDonald's

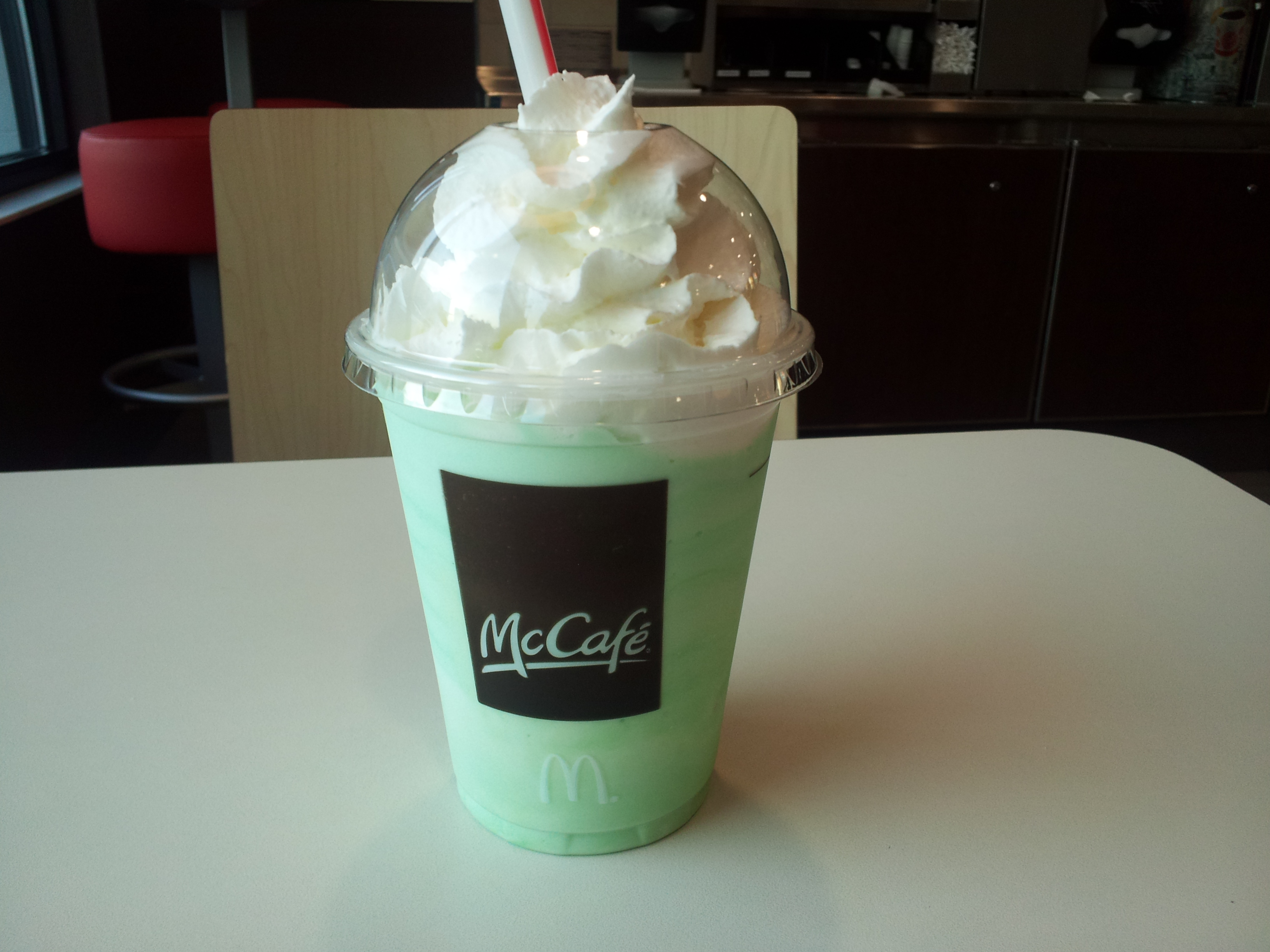
- A "Shamrock Shake" sitting on a table at a McDonald's in 2012
- Current owner: McDonald's
- Country: United States, Canada, Ireland, United Kingdom, Australia, New Zealand
- Introduced: 1967 (Connecticut); 1970 (select US locations)

The Shamrock Shake is a seasonal green mint flavored milkshake dessert sold at some McDonald's restaurants to celebrate St. Patrick's Day in the US, Canada, Ireland, Australia, New Zealand and the UK.

== Origin ==
Hal Rosen, a McDonald's owner and operator from Connecticut, created the first Shamrock Shake in 1967. Three years later, in 1970, the Shamrock Shake debuted in select locations in the United States. Rogers Merchandising in Chicago created the shake. Initially, the shake was lemon/lime flavored with vanilla ice cream, lemon/lime sherbet, and vanilla syrup. By 1973, the shake was merely a green colored vanilla shake, eliminating the lemon/lime sherbet. It is now mint flavored.

Shamrock Shakes are sold at select U.S. and Canadian stores during the months of February and March, as well as in Ireland.

In March 2025, the Shamrock Shake was introduced into the United Kingdom.

== The creation of the Ronald McDonald House ==
In 1974, the daughter of a Philadelphia Eagles player was being treated for leukemia. With the Children's Hospital of Philadelphia, McDonald's founder Ray Kroc, the Philadelphia Eagles, and Hal Rosen, her family raised the funds from Shamrock Shake sales necessary to create the first Ronald McDonald house.

== Advertising ==
Starting in 1975, McDonald's used the Uncle O'Grimacey character (a relative of Grimace who came to visit in March) to market Shamrock Shakes. The character is described as a green Grimace that wears a green cob hat, a shillelagh, and a vest with shamrocks on them. Sometime in around the mid-1980s, McDonald's phased out Uncle O'Grimacey from their mascot lineup.

In 1980, McDonald's introduced the Shamrock Sundae which consisted of vanilla ice cream topped with a mint green Shamrock syrup. The product was discontinued after one year due to poor sales.

In 2017, McDonald's introduced a few variants of the Shamrock Shake including the Shamrock Chocolate Shake, the Shamrock Chocolate Chip Frappé, the Shamrock Mocha, and the Shamrock Hot Chocolate.

In 2025, McDonald's would bring back the Uncle O'Grimacey character, as well as offer the Shamrock Shake in Australia, New Zealand, and the UK for the first time.

== See also ==
- Grimace Shake
