= Grimace's Birthday =

2023 video game

- Menu screen
- Developer: Krool Toys
- Publisher: McDonald's
- Producer: Mike Wires
- Designer: Tom Lockwood
- Programmer: Bryan Taylor
- Artist: Tom Lockwood
- Platform: Browser (Note: The game was developed using GB Studio, a development environment for Game Boy games. As such, the ROM image for the game is compatible with Game Boy Color hardware.)
- Release: 12 June 2023
- Genre: Platformer
- Mode: Single-player

Grimace's Birthday is a 2023 browser-based platformer game developed by Krool Toys and published by McDonald's. The game was a promotional title released to coincide with the launch of the Grimace Shake on 12 June 2023. Development of Grimace's Birthday used GB Studio, a tool to create games compatible with use on Game Boy hardware, although the game was not a Nintendo-licensed title and did not receive a physical release. Grimace's Birthday was positively received, with several critics directing attention to the unexpected theme and medium for a promotional game and the strong likeness of the game's visual presentation to Game Boy titles.

== Gameplay ==
An example of the gameplay in Grimace's Birthday.

Grimace's Birthday is a side-scrolling platformer in which the player takes control of Grimace throughout four levels with two stages each. In the first stage, the player controls Grimace on a skateboard, able to perform rail grinds and other tricks. In the second stage, Grimace moves freely and has a bubble power-up, allowing him to float. Each level is scored against a time limit, with points accumulated from actions such as defeating enemies and performing tricks. Throughout the levels, the player can collect Grimace Shakes for bonus points. After completing every level, the player can complete a bonus minigame and blow out the candles of their birthday cake for bonus points. Grimace's Birthday features two game modes besides the main story mode: a "Score Attack" mode in which the player is tasked with gaining as many points as possible under a time limit and a "Freeskate" mode in which the player can move freely with no time limit.

== Plot ==
Grimace is preparing for his birthday party at McDonald's, but his McDonaldland friends— Birdie the Early Bird, the Hamburglar, and the McNugget Buddies—are missing. He must find them all before his birthday ends at midnight. On his journey, Grimace catches Hamburglar stealing burgers and later finds Birdie tangled in telephone wires. However, he soon discovers that Birdie and the McNugget Buddies were actually planning a surprise for him. With his friends reunited, Grimace returns to McDonald’s, blows out the candles on his cake, and calls it the "best birthday ever."

== Development ==
Grimace's Birthday was commissioned by Wieden+Kennedy on behalf of McDonald's and produced and directed by Brooklyn-based studio Krool Toys, founded by Tia Chinai and Stefan Cohen. The game was released as a promotional tool to coincide with the release of the Grimace Shake and the limited-edition Grimace Birthday Meal. (Note: The exact date of Grimace's birthday is unknown.) A McDonald's press release stated the promotion aimed to "pay homage" to "childhood memories [at] McDonald's" by putting a "modern spin on these memories" through marketing that meets the "intersection of nostalgia and culture". Though the game did not receive a physical release, it is the first promotional title for McDonald's playable on a console since the 1993 Sega Genesis title McDonald's Treasure Land Adventure.

The gameplay of Grimace's Birthday was designed by Tom Lockwood and coded by Bryan Taylor. This was done through GB Studio, a game development tool that allows the creation of ROM images compatible with Game Boy hardware. It was developed under time constraints, and was completed in less than seven weeks to coincide with the release of other Grimace's Birthday promotions. The game was released on 12 June 2023 as a browser game on the Krool Toys website, and while not released as a physical title, the ROM image was uploaded to the Internet Archive, allowing it to be loaded onto a flash cartridge and played on Game Boy Color hardware. The game would later be released on Itch.io for the Game Boy Color and Analogue Pocket.

== Reception ==
Several critics noted the unexpected quality of Grimace's Birthday, with Andrew Liszewski of Gizmodo describing the game as a "surprisingly solid platformer" and Zoey Handley of Destructoid expressing surprise that the game was "actually good". Handley praised the "well-executed variety" of the game modes, while criticizing the short length of the game, writing that the mechanics were underused. Mariella Moon of Engadget noted the game "worked smoothly", but stated she struggled with jumping over obstacles and sliding across hand rails, citing her "clumsy handling of the game's controls".

Critics have commented on the game's strong resemblance to the presentation of Game Boy Color titles. Kelsey Raynor of VG247 noted that the game was developed with a "keen eye for retro games", praising the "real passion and effort". Andrew Cunningham of Ars Technica similarly called the pixel art "legitimately great" and "cleverly designed", noticing the game's request for a color device when a user tried to play the game on the original Game Boy. Ashley Bardhan of Kotaku highlighted the game's marketing, describing the official website as a "part of the perfect 2000s internet time capsule."
