= The Fish Files =

2001 video game

- Developer: 7th Sense
- Publisher: MC2-Microïds
- Platform: Game Boy Color
- Release: 2001
- Genre: Adventure
- Mode: Single-player

The Fish Files is a 2001 adventure game developed by the Italian team 7th Sense and published by MC2-Microïds on the Game Boy Color.

== Gameplay and plot ==
The player takes control on Dante, a college student in search of his kidnapped fish, Ramada. His quest takes him to various cities, towns and other time periods.

The gameplay is in the tradition of Lucasarts point and click adventure titles.

== Reception ==
Reception

Review score
Publication	Score
Official Nintendo Magazine	78%

Adventure Gamers praised the game for its surreal characters and amusing storyline. Jeux Video felt the game alone was justification enough for a customer to purchase a Game Boy.
