= Grimace Shake =

Promotional milkshake sold by McDonald's

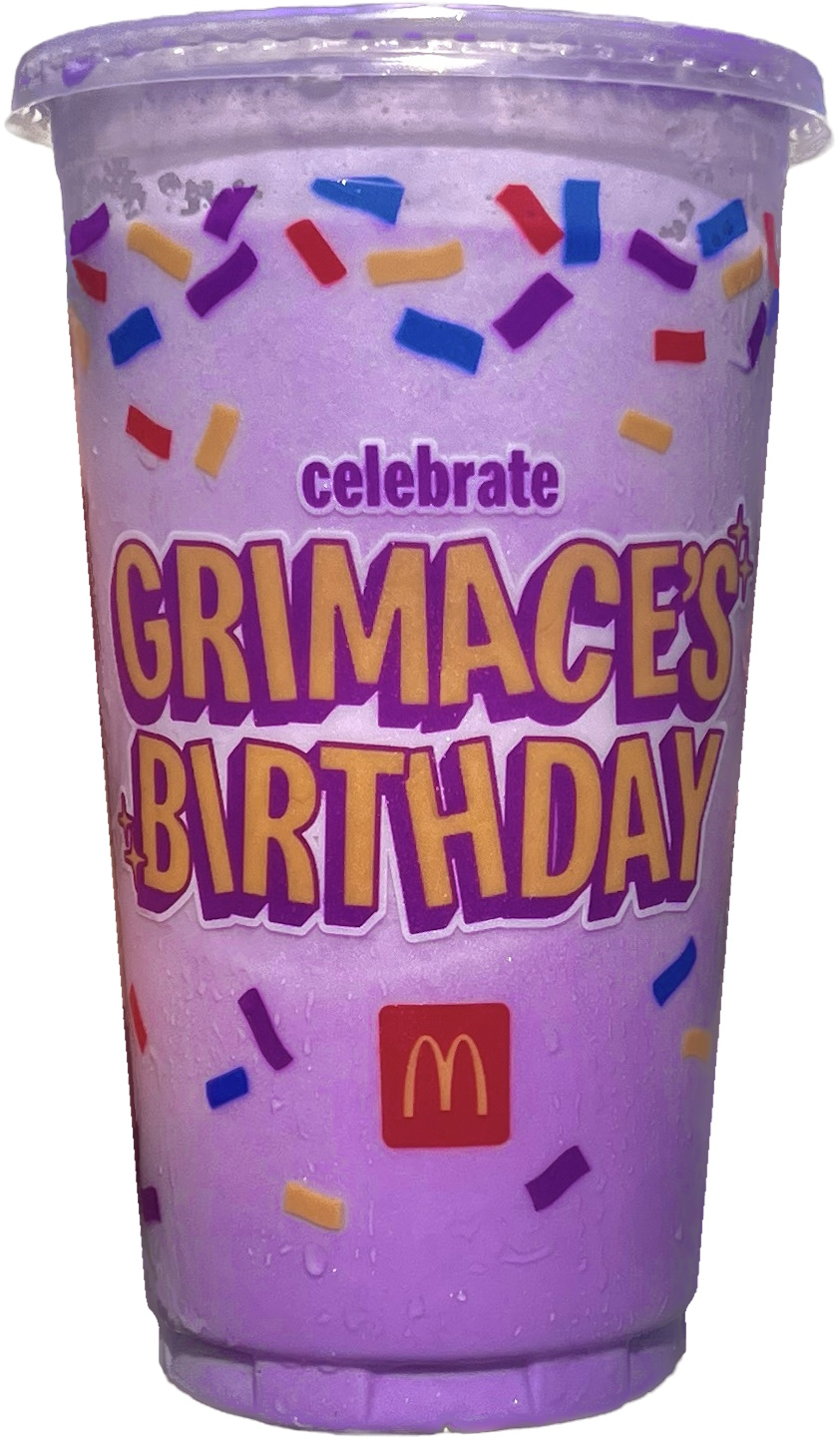
- Product type: Milkshake
- Introduced: June 12, 2023: US: June 12, 2023; CAN: May 14, 2024; UK/IRE: August 28, 2024; AU: October 4, 2024; NZ: October 23, 2024; JP: October 30, 2024; BR: May 13, 2025; HK/CRO: June 9, 2025; TR: June 12, 2025; UKR: June 20, 2025; DE: July 17, 2025; MDA: August 1, 2025; SGP: March 19, 2026; PL: April 22, 2026
- Discontinued: July 9, 2023: US: July 9, 2023; UK/IRE: September 3, 2024; BR: June 1st, 2025
- Markets: Australia, Canada, Ireland, Japan, New Zealand, United Kingdom, United States, Brazil, Hong Kong, Turkey, Ukraine, Moldova, Croatia, Germany, Israel, Mexico, Venezuela, Poland, Singapore, and more as worldwide

The Grimace Shake is a berry-flavored milkshake that was first sold at McDonald's restaurants in the United States, from June 12, 2023, to July 9, 2023, to celebrate the 52nd birthday of Grimace, the purple monster mascot from McDonaldland. The shake was later introduced as a time-limited item in several countries.

The shake gained popularity on TikTok, YouTube and Instagram with the #GrimaceShake trend, where users filmed themselves drinking the shake and then finding themselves in ominous and gruesome staged situations.

== Background ==
The character Grimace was introduced in the McDonaldland media franchise in 1971 as "Evil Grimace". His original character had four arms and would steal people's milkshakes. McDonald's soon changed the character to a purple, smiling blob with two arms and a love for milkshakes who accompanied Ronald McDonald and other benevolent characters in advertisements and commercials.

Some McDonald's representatives described Grimace as an "embodiment of a milkshake or a taste bud", but his identity remains up to interpretation for many fans. McDonald's says Grimace comes from Grimace Island, along with other family members like Uncle O'Grimacey, who is known for bringing Shamrock Shakes for Saint Patrick's Day.

== Product description ==
The Grimace Shake is a purple, berry-flavored milkshake. It is a combination of vanilla soft serve and berry flavors. The company did not disclose which flavoring had been used, and consumers reported that they tasted other flavors like Fruity Pebbles or bubblegum. On the UK menu, it was described as containing blueberry-flavored syrup.

In the US, the shake was released as a standalone product and as part of the Grimace Birthday Meal, which included the shake, medium fries, and a choice of a Big Mac or 10-piece Chicken McNuggets.

== Roll-out ==
In June 2023, McDonald's announced the release by changing their profile picture on social media platforms TikTok, Twitter, and Instagram to a picture of Grimace looking at the Grimace Shake. To accompany the release of the meal, McDonald's released a Game Boy-themed browser game, Grimace's Birthday, developed by Krool Toys, and other Grimace-inspired merchandise. "In lieu of gifts" for Grimace, McDonald's suggested that people donate to the Ronald McDonald House Charities. The drink was discontinued in the United States on July 9, 2023.

From May 14, 2024, participating Canadian McDonald's locations offered the shake for a limited time after multiple responses from consumers suggesting that the shakes should be available on the nation's menu. It was then introduced to the United Kingdom and Ireland on August 28 as part of promotions celebrating McDonald's 50th anniversary in the country, available for one week until September 3. Later introductions in 2024 included Australia on October 4, New Zealand on October 23, and Japan on October 30. In 2025 the shake was introduced in Brazil on May 13, Hong Kong on June 9, Croatia on June 9, Turkey on June 12, Ukraine on June 20, Israel on July 8, Germany on July 17, Moldova on August 1, Mexico on September 2, and Venezuela on October 27. On March 19, 2026, the Grimace Shake was introduced to Singapore. On April 22, 2026, the Grimace Shake was introduced to Poland.

== Critical reviews ==
The Grimace Shake received mixed reviews from critics. Dane Rivera of Uproxx called it "the best flavor in the McDonald's milkshake lineup." Delish gave it a positive review, calling it "the sweetest berry smoothie of your life". Rechel Chapman, writing for Elite Daily, was "not a fan of the flavor", which she described as "very fruity and artificial tasting". A review by Business Insider described the taste as smooth and not too sweet, but also artificial and ultimately underwhelming. Steven Luna of Mashed.com said that, despite the shake being "pretty" and "magical-looking," it was disappointing and a "troubling tribute to a garrulous grape-colored goofball who deserves so much better".

== TikTok trend ==
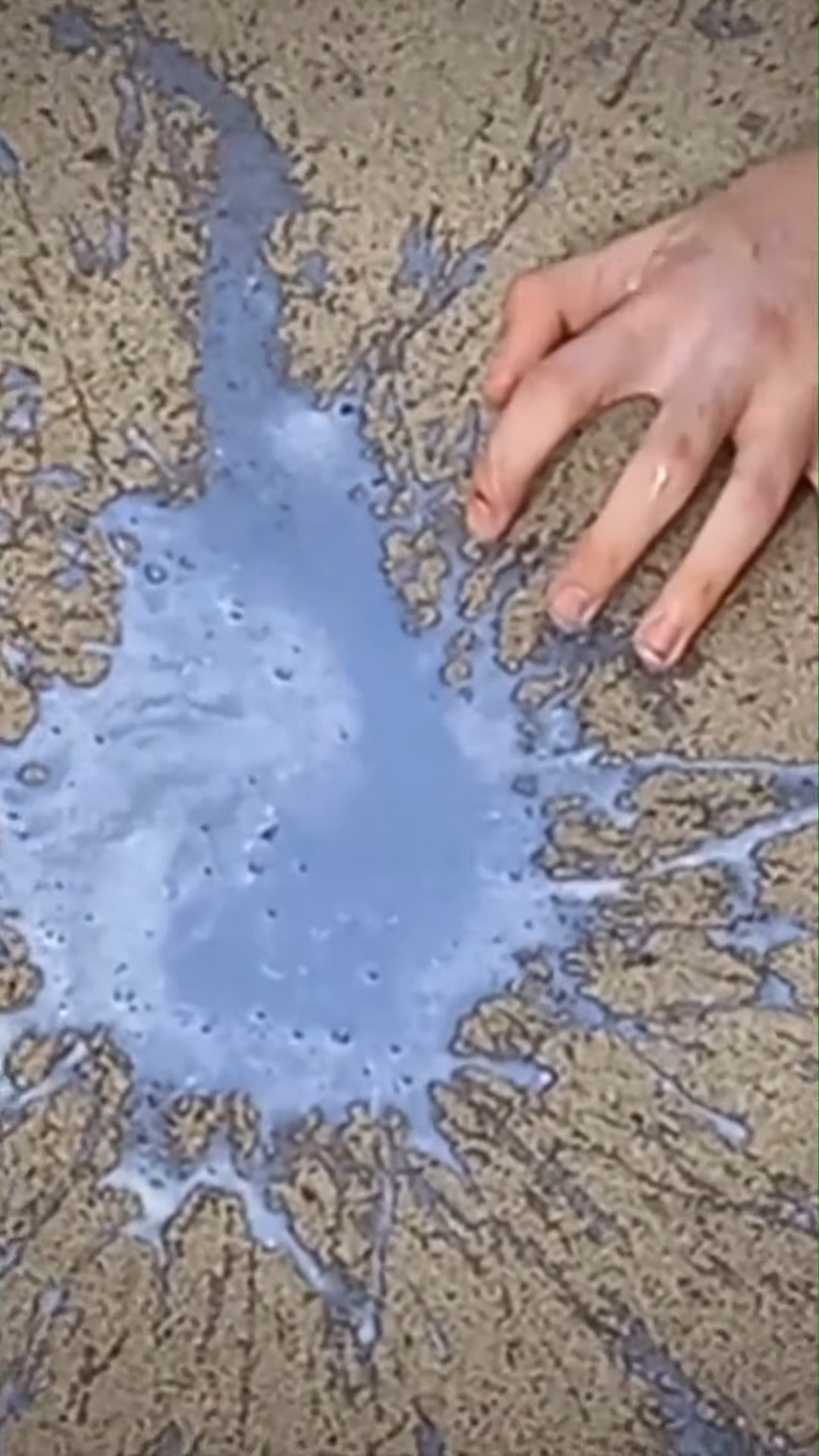
A social media user pretending to have died after drinking the Grimace Shake

A TikTok video trend with the hashtag #GrimaceShake gained popularity shortly after the release of the shake. In the videos, users recorded themselves wishing Grimace a happy birthday while drinking the shake. The video would then cut to a scene of the users finding themselves in unusual positions and in strange locations, or being discovered dead while covered in the drink. This trend led the hashtag #grimaceshake getting over 145k posts on TikTok. The videos are staged to look like a crime scene, with the shake splattered around, implying that Grimace is the assassin who is responsible for their transformation. TikTok user @thefrazmaz (Austin Frazier) was considered to have posted the first instance of this trend.

This trend stemmed from a similar trend involving the Whopper released to promote Spider-Man: Across the Spider-Verse, due to both products having unnatural colors. The trend spread to other products, such as Barbie-themed products by Krispy Kreme and Cold Stone, where consumers appear more feminine or "yassified" after consumption. As of July 12, 2023, the hashtag had over one billion views.

=== Response from McDonald's ===
McDonald's did not anticipate the Grimace Shake's popularity or its related trends. The company responded publicly to the trend with a TikTok video starring Grimace captioned: "meee pretending i don't see the grimace shake trendd [sic]". McDonald's social media director Guillaume Huin said the Grimace Shake trend was unexpected and described it as "brilliant creativity, unfiltered fun, peak absurdist Gen Z humor". However, at the time he felt that acknowledging the trend would be risky, as he felt that "the campaign was already wildly successful, both on a social and business standpoint, so why would we take the 'risk' to jump in?"

== Sales impact ==
The US launch of the Grimace Shake and its resulting publicity increased McDonald's next quarter sales by 10.3% in stores that had been open for at least a year. In the April–June period of 2023, sales rose by 12%, exceeding The Wall Street Journal's estimate of 9.3%. In the quarter after the Grimace Shake release, McDonald's reported $6.5 billion in sales, which beat estimates by $200 million.

== Controversies ==
=== Advertising ===
Many speculated that the Grimace Shake trend on TikTok was an intentional advertising strategy to raise awareness of the McDonald's brand for younger audiences; its indeterminate flavor and unnatural purple color have garnered significant attention on social media platforms. However, the company has stated that it never intended for the shake to become so viral, with McDonald's social media director saying "This was a level of genius creativity and organic fun that I could never dream about or plan for—it was all from the fans, and the fans only". The virality of the trend on social media also boosted McDonald's sales as many came to McDonald's to buy the shake after seeing the trend on TikTok, resulting in stores running out of ice cream early in the day.

=== Fandom advertisement ===
Around the time of the June 2023 release, McDonald's paid Fandom to replace the Grimace page on the McDonald's Wiki with an advertisement promoting the Grimace Shake and other pieces of Grimace media, such as the video game. Nathan Steinmetz, who wrote the original Grimace article, said that the move disrupted editorial independence. Fandom staff stated that the paid advertisement from McDonald's would last for the duration of the Grimace Shake promotion, and users would not be able to edit the page.
