= Game Boy Color =

Handheld game console by Nintendo

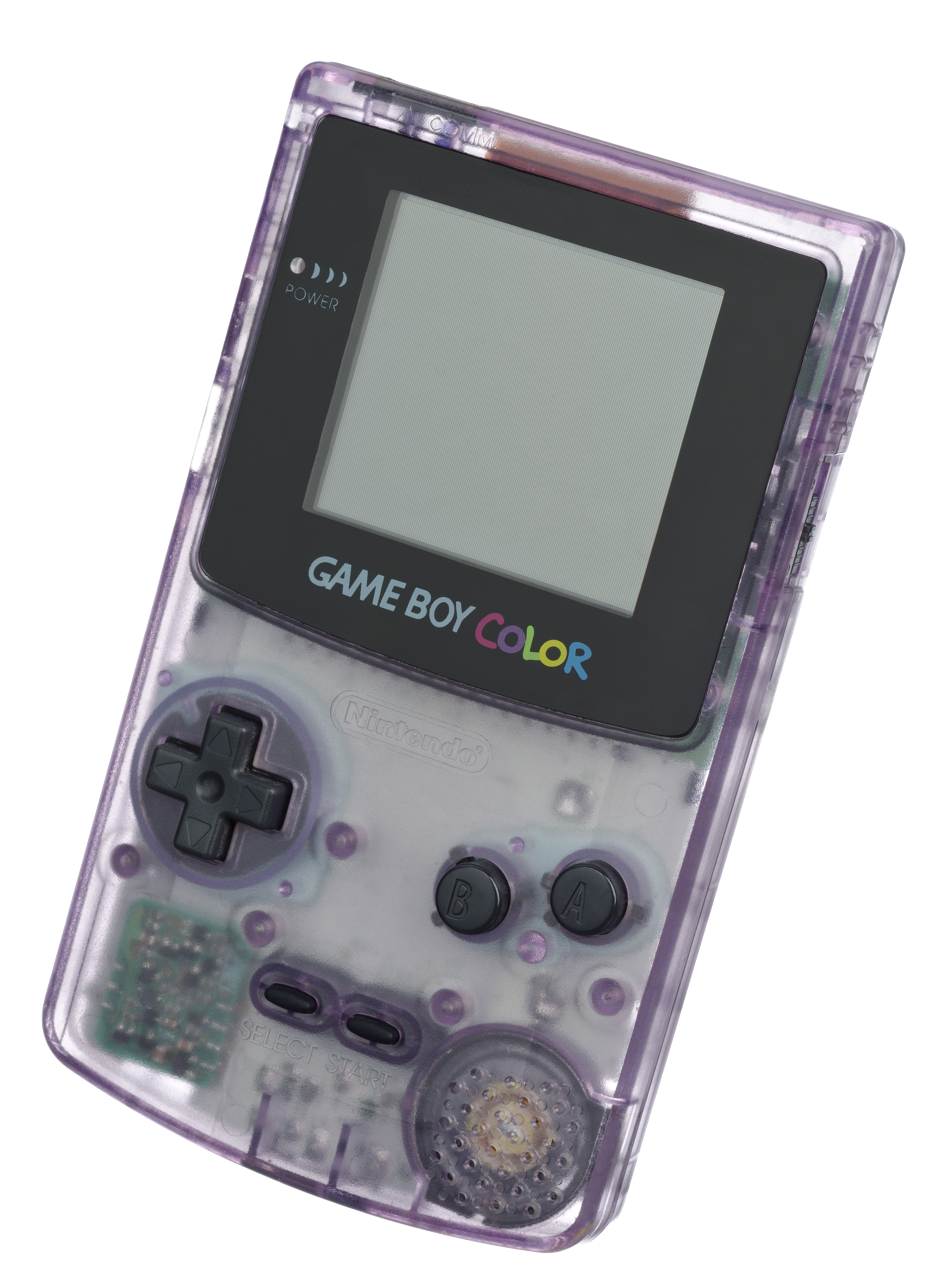
- Game Boy Color with Atomic Purple case
- Developer: Nintendo Research & Engineering
- Manufacturer: Nintendo
- Product family: Game Boy
- Type: Handheld game console
- Generation: Fifth
- Released: October 21, 1998: JP: October 21, 1998; NA: November 18, 1998; EU: November 23, 1998; AU: November 27, 1998
- Introductory price: US$79.95 (equivalent to $160 in 2025)
- Discontinued: March 31, 2003
- Units sold: 118.69 million (including all Game Boy variants)
- Media: Game Boy Color Game Pak; Game Boy Game Pak
- System on a chip: Nintendo CPU CGB
- CPU: Sharp SM83 @ 4.2 / 8.4 MHz
- Memory: 32 KB RAM, 16 KB Video RAM
- Display: Reflective TFT LCD 160 × 144 px, 44 × 40 mm (1.7 × 1.6 in)
- Connectivity: Infrared
- Online services: JP: Mobile System GB
- Best-selling game: Pokémon Gold and Silver (23 million) (list)
- Backward compatibility: Game Boy
- Predecessor: Game Boy
- Successor: Game Boy Advance

The Game Boy Color (Note: Japanese: ゲームボーイカラー) (abbreviated as CGB or GBC) is an 8-bit handheld game console developed by Nintendo. It was released in Japan on October 21, 1998, and in international markets the following month. It shipped with red, blue, green, yellow, cyan, and atomic purple (as shown on the picture of the console). Compared with the original Game Boy, the Game Boy Color features a color TFT screen instead of monochrome, a CPU running at up to twice the speed, and four times as much memory. It is backward compatible with games developed for its predecessor. The Game Boy Color was released during the fifth generation of video game consoles and competed with Bandai's Japan-only WonderSwan and SNK's Neo Geo Pocket Color.

The handheld is slightly thicker, taller and has a smaller screen than its immediate predecessor, the Game Boy Pocket, but is significantly smaller than the original Game Boy. As with its predecessors, the Game Boy Color has a custom 8-bit processor made by Sharp. The American English spelling of the system's name, Game Boy Color, remains consistent throughout the world.

The Game Boy Color received positive reviews upon release, and was praised for its backwards compatibility with games from its predecessor. It had a relatively brief lifespan, being succeeded by the Game Boy Advance after less than three years on the market. The Game Boy and the Game Boy Color combined have sold 118.69 million units worldwide, making them the fourth best-selling system of all time. The best-selling games developed primarily for the Game Boy Color are Pokémon Gold and Silver (1999), which shipped 23 million units worldwide, and the best-selling game developed exclusively for it is Pokémon Crystal (2000), which shipped 6.39 million units worldwide.

== History ==
The original Game Boy was first introduced in 1989. The device was a monochrome handheld, and one of its competitors, the Atari Lynx, featured a color screen. While the Lynx's color display was visually impressive, it was criticized for its bulky size and poor battery life. The Game Boy, in contrast, offered superior portability and longevity, propelling it to immense popularity. Publicly, Nintendo pledged to develop a color Game Boy, but only when technology limitations could be addressed.

Internally, a team led by Satoru Okada, who played a key role in the original Game Boy's design, was experimenting with color displays. Their early-1990s prototype, codenamed "Project Atlantis," featured a color screen and a powerful 32-bit processor from Sharp. However, the team was not satisfied with the outcome and shelved further development.

Despite the lack of color, consumer interest in the Game Boy remained strong. In 1996, Nintendo released the slimmer Game Boy Pocket, and the launch of the Pokémon series that same year further boosted sales. However, developers were losing interest in creating new games for the aging platform.

Additional market pressure for Nintendo came in October 1997 when news broke about Bandai's new handheld, the WonderSwan. The project was led by Gunpei Yokoi, the engineer who led the development of the Game & Watch series and the original Game Boy. Yokoi had left Nintendo in 1996 following the commercial failure of his final project at the company, the Virtual Boy. His departure caused a stir, with investors dumping Nintendo stock, forcing a temporary halt on trading at the Tokyo Stock Exchange. Yokoi was killed in a roadside accident in 1997 before the WonderSwan's release.

Faced with mounting pressure, Okada revisited Project Atlantis. Prioritizing quickly bringing a device to market over processing power, he dropped the 32-bit chip in favor of a faster version of the existing Game Boy's 8-bit processor that would allow for a sooner launch and maintain compatibility with the existing library of Game Boy games.

The Game Boy Color was announced in March 1998 and released in Japan that October. It received an international rollout throughout November (amid the busy Christmas holiday shopping season), reaching North America on the 18th, Europe on the 23rd, and Australasia on the 27th. Launching at a price of US$79.95 (equivalent to $160 in 2025), the Game Boy Color ultimately outsold the WonderSwan, which went on sale in March 1999.

The Game Boy Color had a relatively short lifespan, being on the market for only two and a half years before being succeeded by the Game Boy Advance in 2001. The successor finally brought the 32-bit processing power envisioned in Project Atlantis. Despite the new system, the Game Boy Color remained in production, serving as a budget-friendly alternative. The last units were reportedly sold by March 2003.

== Hardware ==
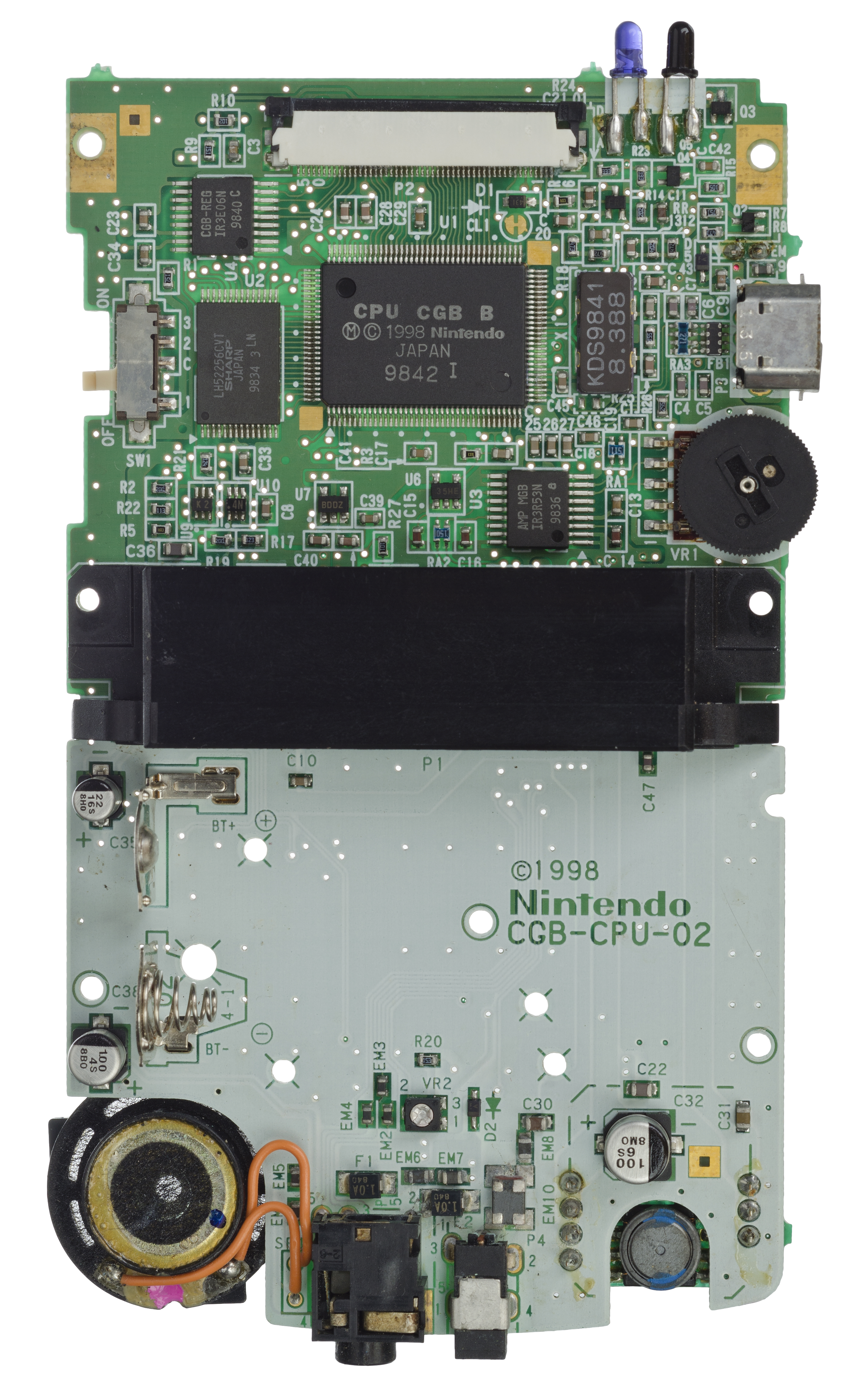
The Game Boy Color motherboard (annotated version)

The Game Boy Color uses a custom system-on-a-chip (SoC) that integrates the CPU and other major components into a single package, designated the CPU CGB by Nintendo and manufactured by the Sharp Corporation. While the CPU CGB was a new design for the Game Boy Color, the technology was largely an evolution of the ten-year-old DMG-CPU SoC used in the original Game Boy.

Within the CPU CGB, the main processor is the same Sharp SM83 that powered the original Game Boy. Derived from two other 8-bit processors: the Intel 8080 and the Zilog Z80, the SM83 features the seven 8-bit registers of the 8080—lacking the alternate registers of the Z80—but uses the Z80's programming syntax and additional bit manipulation instructions, along with new instructions optimized for operations specific to the hardware design.

While in the original Game Boy, the SM83 operated at a clock rate of 4.194304 megahertz (MHz), games can command the processor in the Game Boy Color to operate in "dual-speed mode," doubling its frequency to 8.388608 MHz. This allowed developers to achieve twice the processing power when creating games exclusively for the Game Boy Color, while maintaining backward compatibility with existing games.

The CPU CGB incorporates the Picture Processing Unit, a basic GPU that renders visuals using 16 kilobytes (KB) of Video RAM, twice as much as that of the original Game Boy. Games developed specifically for the Game Boy Color could fully utilize this additional memory, enabling enhanced effects and displaying up to 56 colors simultaneously from a palette of 32,768 colors. Programmers subsequently developed the "high color mode" technique, which involved rapidly switching color palettes to display over 2,000 colors at once. This feature was used in games such as The Fish Files, The New Addams Family and Alone in the Dark: The New Nightmare. When a Game Pak compatible with the original Game Boy is inserted, the additional video RAM is disabled.

The screen is a 2.3-inch (diagonal) thin-film transistor (TFT) color liquid-crystal display (LCD), measuring 44 millimeters (1.7 in) wide by 40 millimeters (1.6 in) high. The screen aspect ratio and resolution remain identical to the original Game Boy at 160 pixels wide by 144 pixels high in a 10:9 format. Like the original Game Boy and Game Boy Pocket before it and the Game Boy Advance after it, the screen is passively reflective, with a surface behind it that reflects ambient light back through the liquid crystal elements toward the viewer. Because there is no backlight, the device can be hard to use in dark environments.

Additionally, the SoC contains a 2 KB "bootstrap" ROM which is used to start up the device, 127 B of high RAM that can be accessed faster (similar to a CPU cache), and the Audio Processing Unit, a programmable sound generator with four channels: a pulse wave generation channel with frequency and volume variation, a second pulse wave generation channel with only volume variation, a wave channel that can reproduce a waveform, and a white noise channel with volume variation. The motherboard of the Game Boy Color contains a 32 KB "work" RAM chip, four times more than the original Game Boy.

The Game Boy Color features a D-pad (directional pad), four action buttons ('A', 'B', 'START', and 'SELECT'), and a sliding on–off switch on the right side of the device. Volume is adjusted by a potentiometer dial on the left side of the device. The left side also has a Game Link Cable port for connecting up to four Game Boy devices for multiplayer games or data transfer. The port used on the Game Boy Color is of a smaller design first introduced on the Game Boy Pocket and requires an adapter to link with the original Game Boy. The Game Boy Color also included a "high-speed" mode that allowed data to be transmitted up to 64 times faster over the Game Link Cable than on the original Game Boy. The Game Boy Color included an infrared communications port for wireless data transfer, but it was only supported by a small number of games and consequently was not included on the later Game Boy Advance line.

=== Technical specifications ===
Height	133.5 mm (5 1/4 in)
Width	78 mm (3 1/8 in)
Depth	27.4 mm (1 1/8 in)
Weight	138 g (4.9 oz)
Display	2.3-inch (diagonal) reflective thin-film transistor (TFT) color liquid-crystal display (LCD)
Screen size (playable)	43 mm × 39 mm (1 3/4 in × 1 1/2 in)
Resolution	160 (w) × 144 (h) pixels (10:9 aspect ratio)
Graphics	Maximum sprites: 40 total, 10 per line, 4 colors each (one transparent); Sprite size: 8 × 8 or 8 × 16; Tiles drawn: 512 (360~399 visible, others off-screen as a scrolling buffer)
Frame rate	59.727500569606 Hz
Color support	32,768 colors, up to 56 simultaneously
System on a chip (SoC)	Nintendo CPU CGB
CPU	Sharp SM83 (custom Intel 8080/Zilog Z80 hybrid, 8-bit) @ 4.194304 or 8.388608 MHz
Memory	On SoC: 2 KB ROM, 127 B High RAM, 16 KB Video RAM, 128 B Audio RAM, 1.12KB object attribute RAM; Internal: 32 KB RAM; External: (in the game cartridge) up to 8 MB ROM, up to 128 KB RAM
Power	Consumption: 70–80 mA; Internal: 2 × AA batteries; External: 0.6 W at 3 V DC from 2.35 mm × 0.75 mm coaxial connector
Battery life	Up to 10 hours
Sound	Channels: 2 pulse wave, 1 wave, 1 noise; Outputs: Built-in mono speaker, stereo 3.5mm headphone jack
I/O	Game Link Cable (up to 512 kbit/s, between up to 4 devices); Game Boy Game Pak slot; Infrared (up to 9.5 kbit/s, usable at distances less than 2 m (6 ft 7 in) and within 45°)
Controls	Eight-way control pad; Four action buttons (A, B, START, SELECT); Volume potentiometer; Power switch

=== Model colors ===
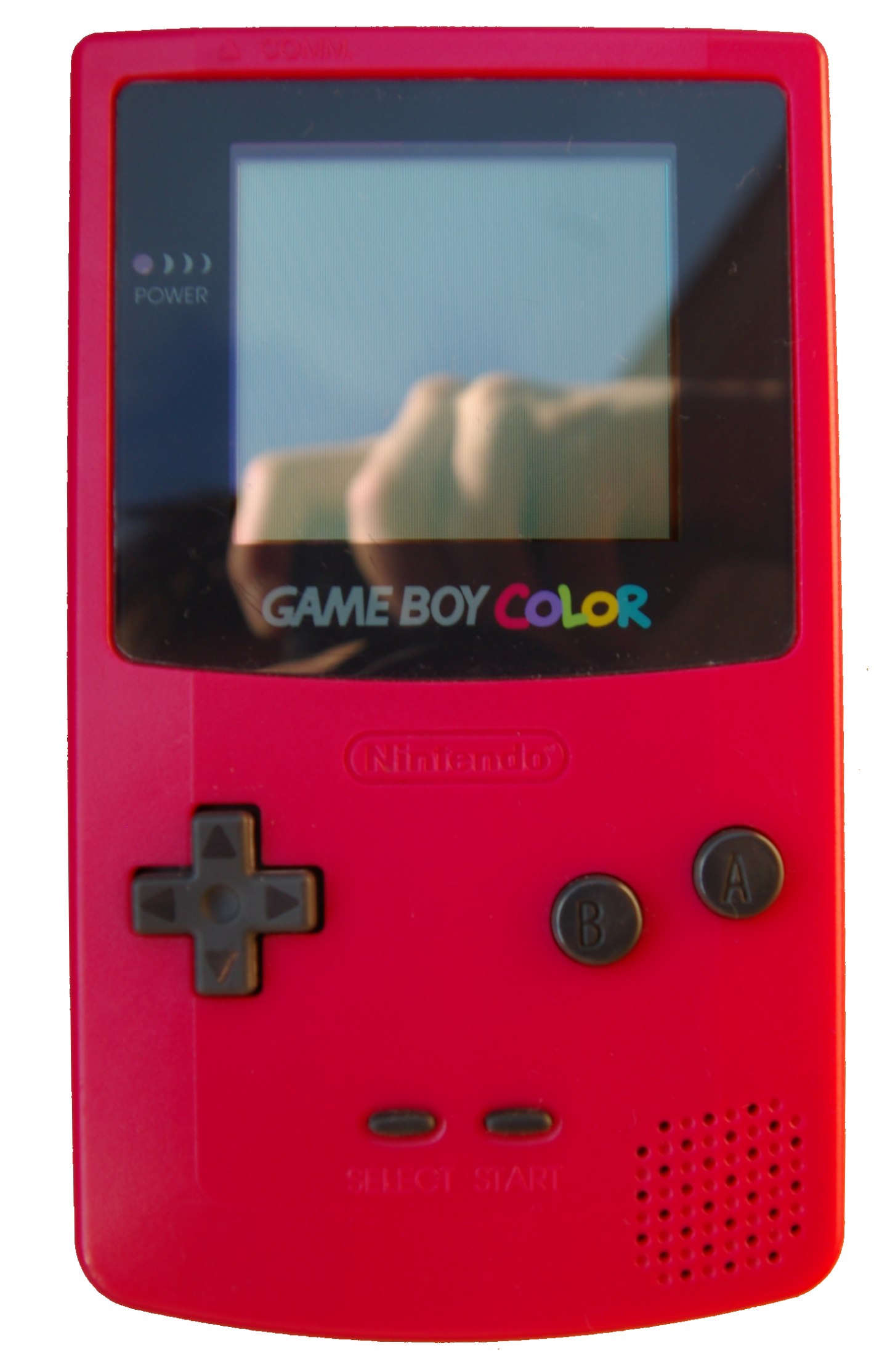
Berry

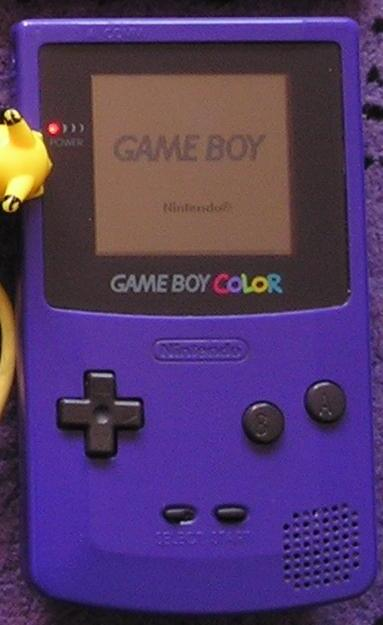
Grape

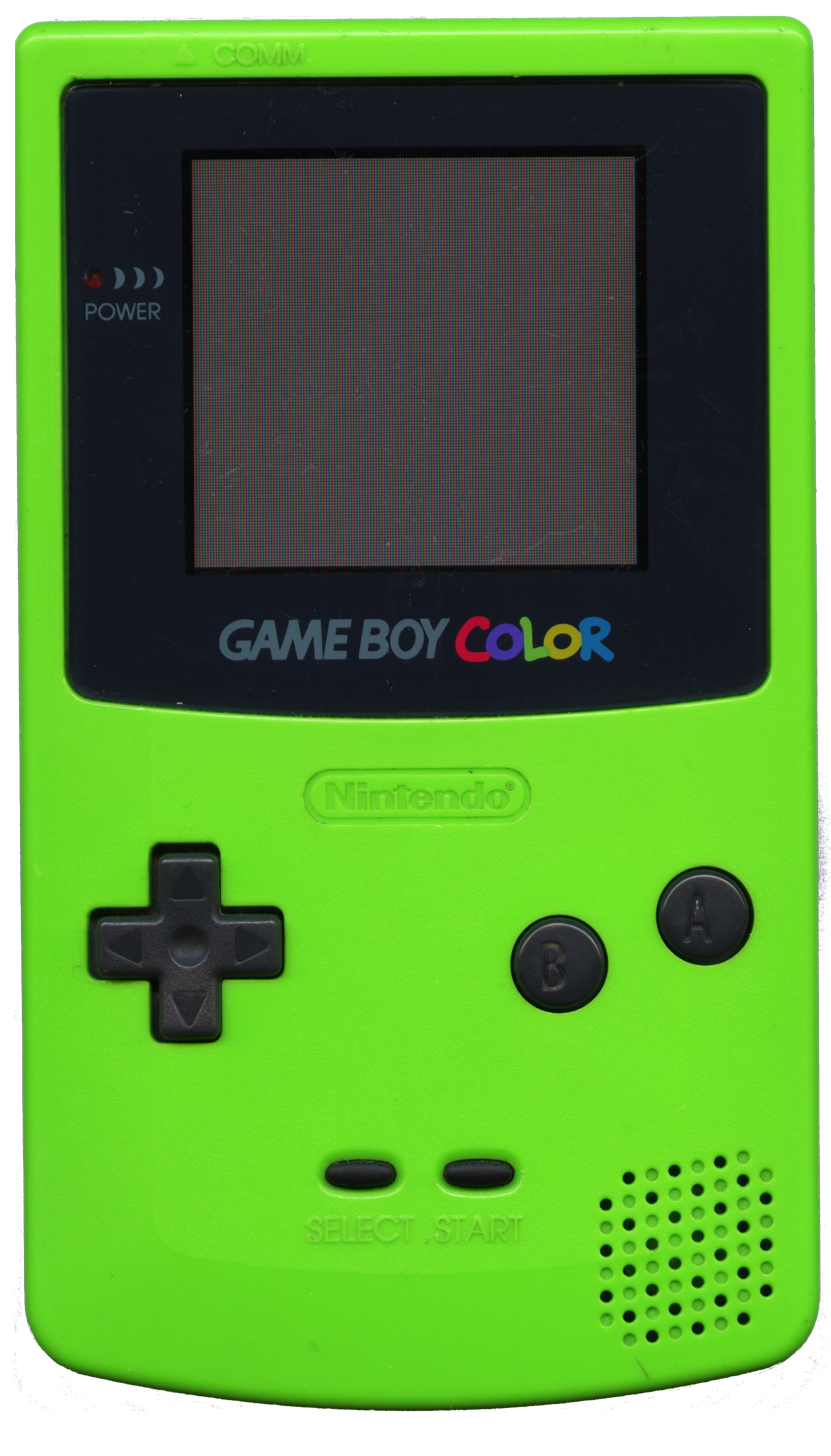
Kiwi

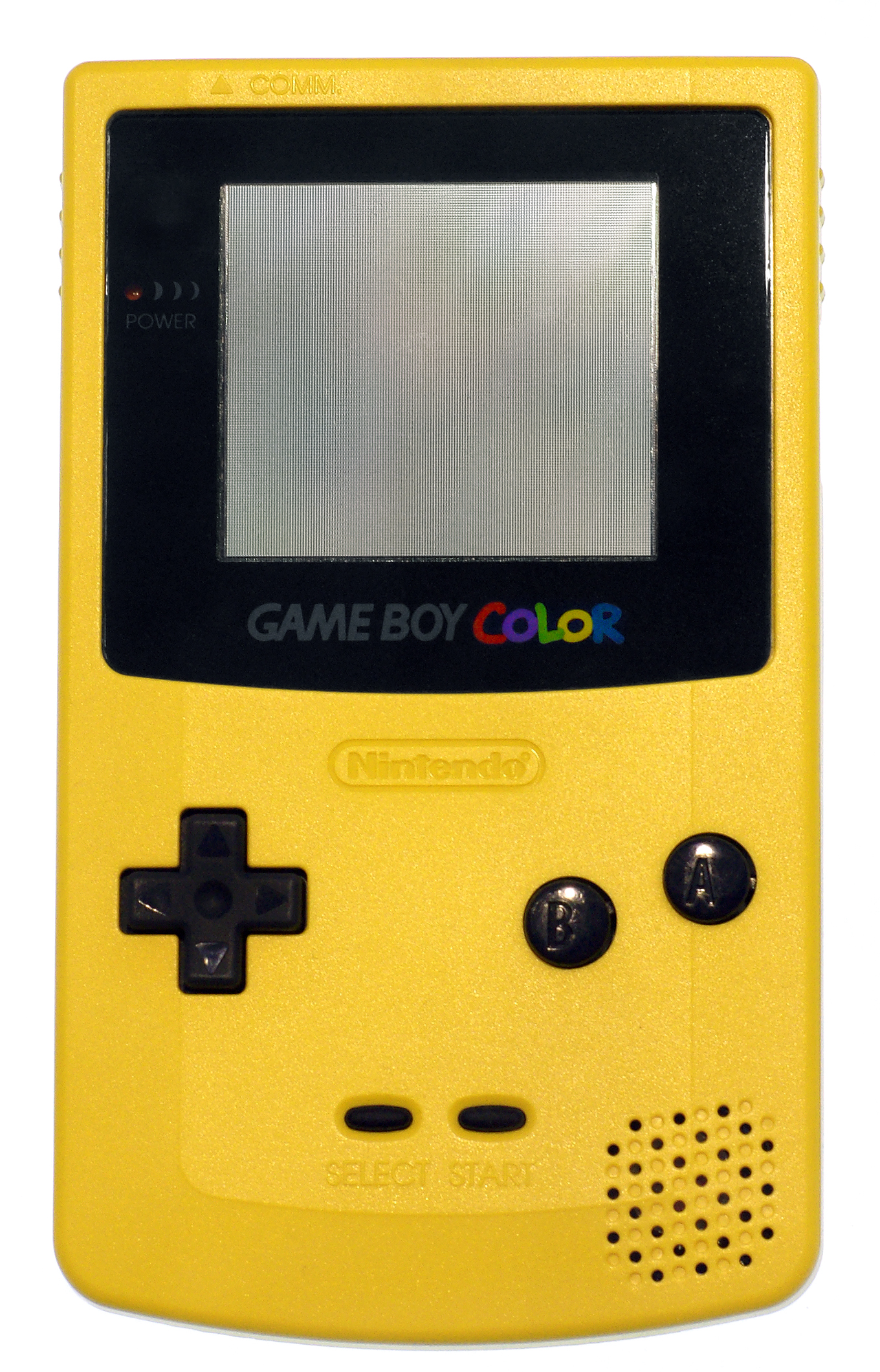
Dandelion

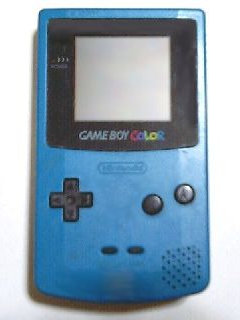
Teal

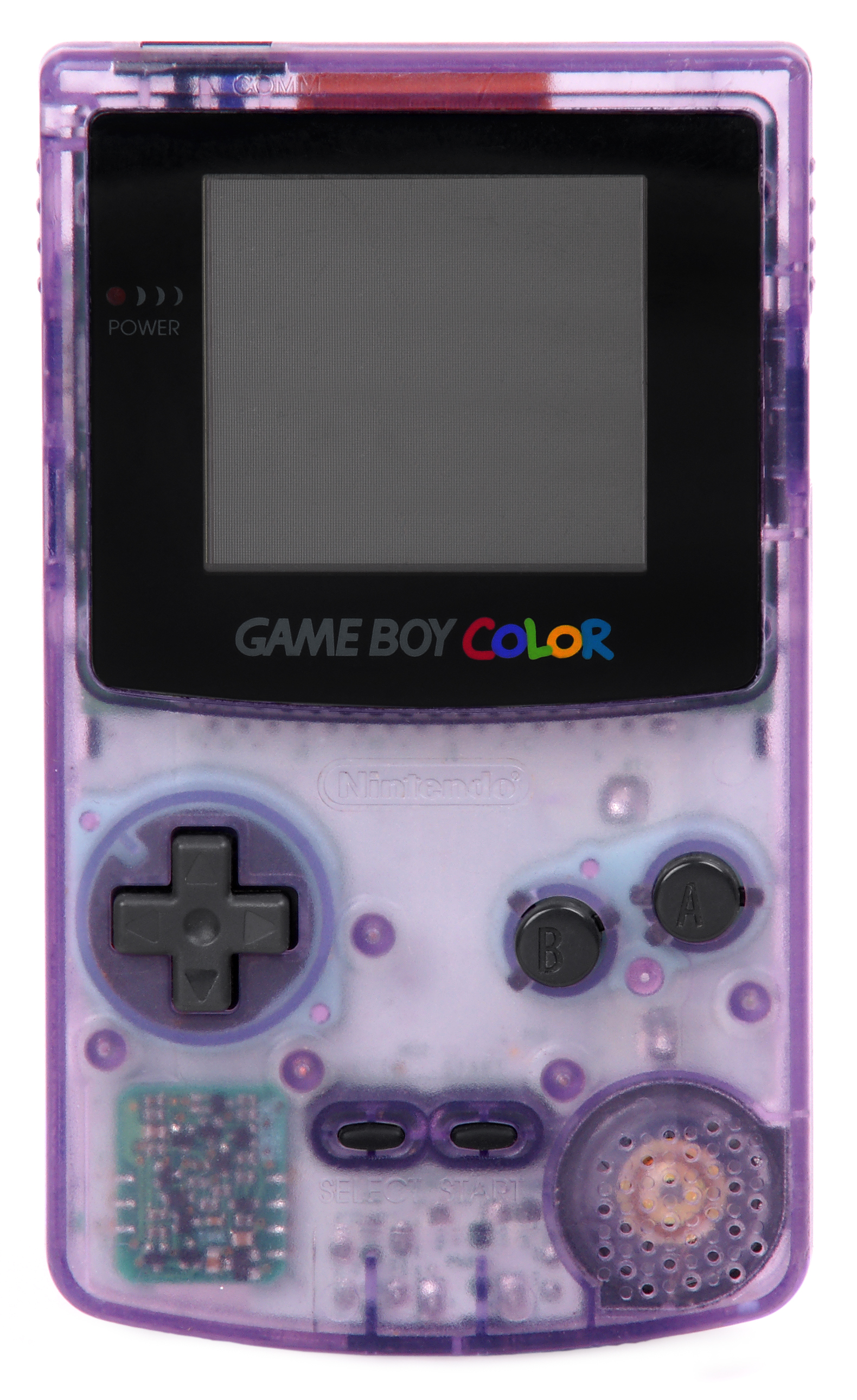
Atomic Purple

Nintendo had seen success selling colored variations of the Play It Loud! Game Boy and the Game Boy Pocket, so the company released the Color in several case variations.

The logo for Game Boy Color spells out the word "COLOR" in the five original colors in which the unit was manufactured: Berry (C), Grape (O), Kiwi (L), Dandelion (O), and Teal (R). Another color released at the same time was "Atomic Purple", made of a translucent purple plastic. Other colors were sold as limited editions or in specific countries.

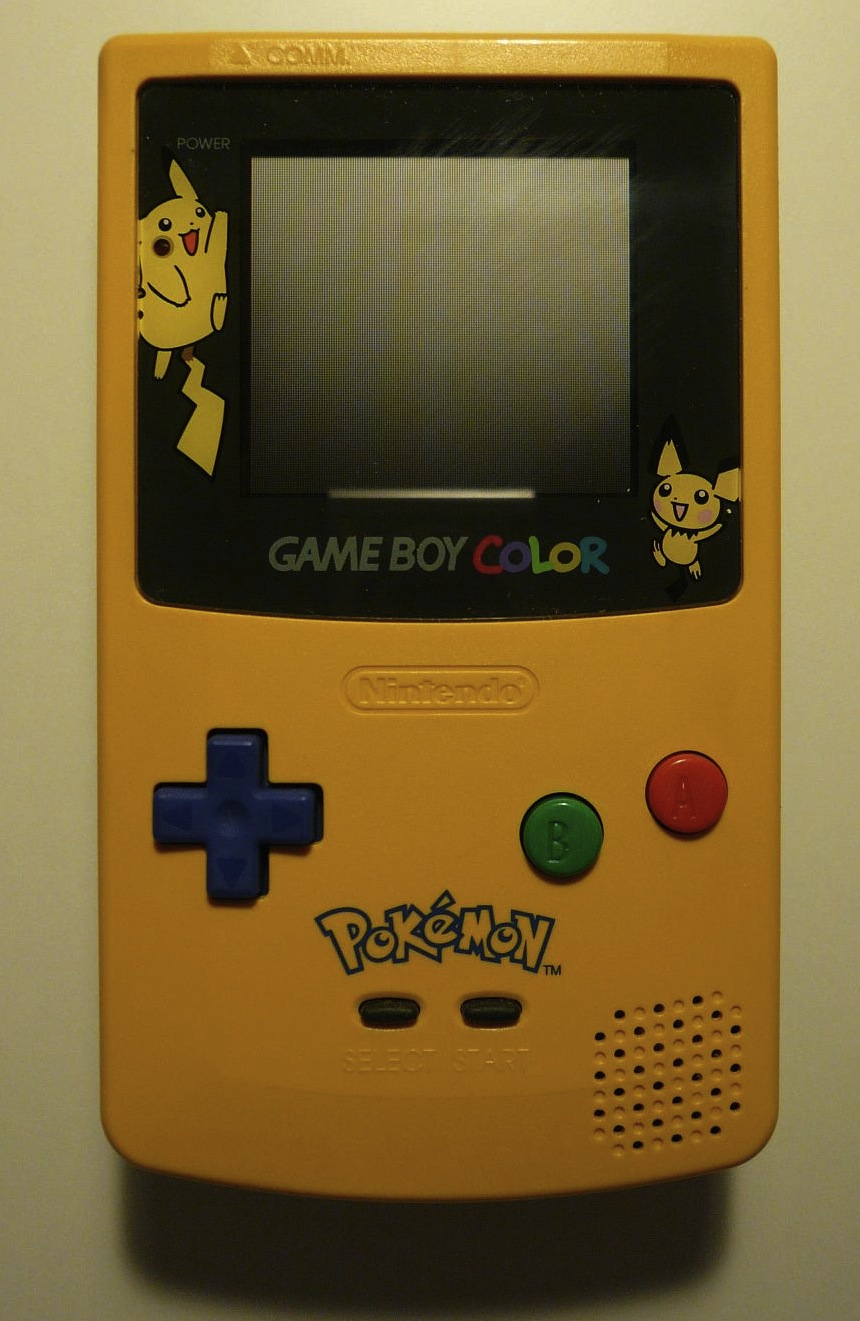
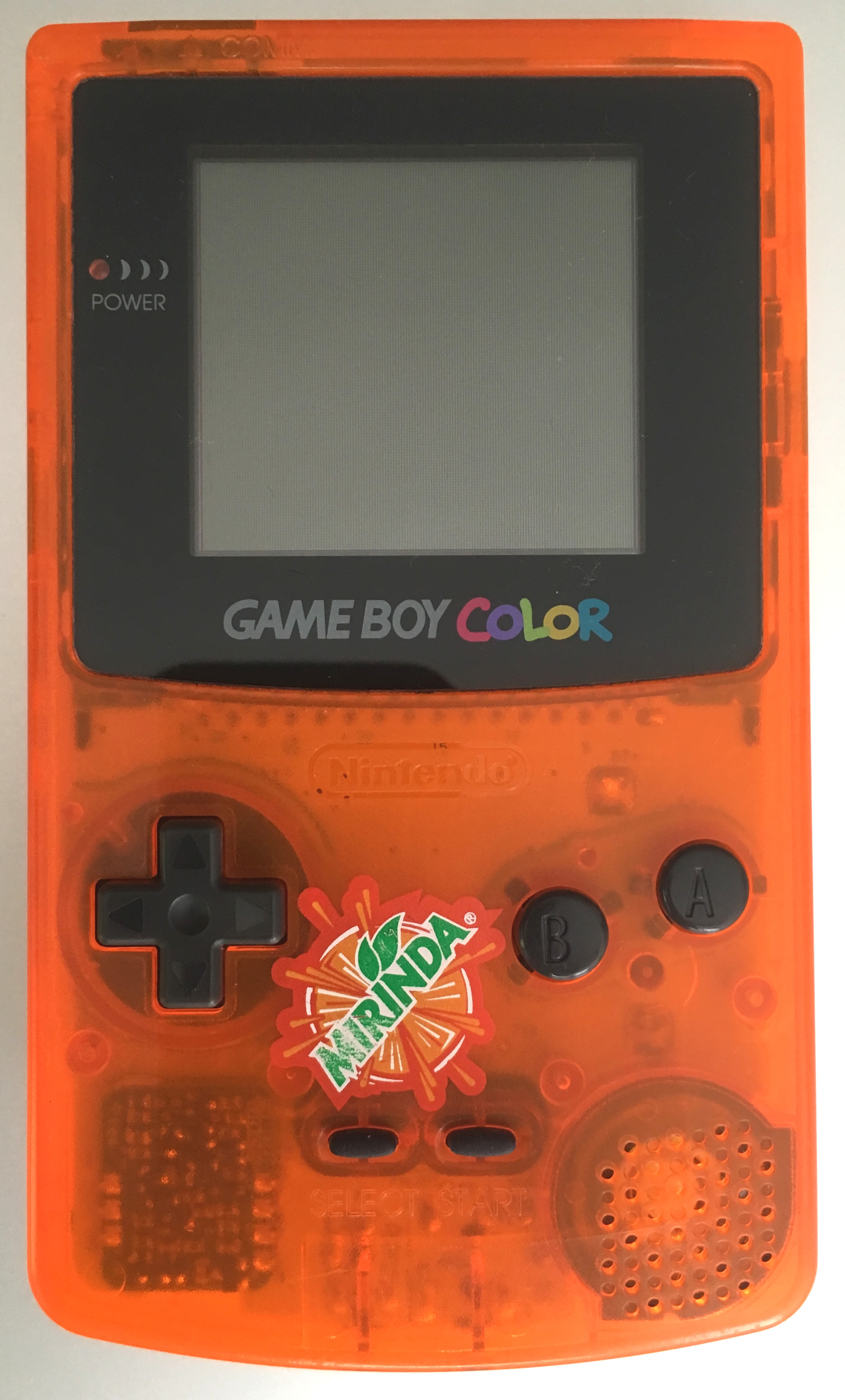
Two special edition Game Boy Color consoles: Pikachu and Mirinda editions

== Games ==
The Game Boy Color launched with an extensive game library, thanks to its ability to play original Game Boy titles. At launch, it featured three exclusive games: Pocket Bomberman, Tetris DX and Wario Land II. Over time, the system amassed 915 titles, in addition to the original Game Boy's catalog of over 1,000 games. In a promotional list of 296 Game Boy Color games, 100 were compatible with the original Game Boy.

Nintendo prohibited simple "colorized" re-releases of monochrome Game Boy titles, requiring developers to implement meaningful gameplay enhancements. These additions included new levels, characters, items, or mechanics that leveraged the system's color capabilities. To ensure these enhancements were significant, Nintendo mandated that they be easily recognizable to players familiar with the monochrome version. Many of these enhanced versions, often called "Deluxe" or "DX", became some of the Game Boy Color's most popular titles, including Tetris DX and The Legend of Zelda: Link's Awakening DX.

The Game Boy Color's improved display and enhanced processing power also enabled more faithful ports of NES games, in contrast to the heavily modified versions created for the original Game Boy due to its monochrome display limitations. One of the most notable examples is Super Mario Bros. Deluxe, which showcased the Game Boy Color's ability to deliver an authentic port of the NES classic.

Tetris for the original Game Boy is the best-selling game compatible with Game Boy Color, Pokémon Gold and Silver are the best-selling games developed primarily for it, and Pokémon Crystal was the best-selling Game Boy Color exclusive title.

The last Game Boy Color game ever released is the Japanese exclusive Doraemon no Study Boy: Kanji Yomikaki Master, on July 18, 2003. The last game released in North America is Harry Potter and the Chamber of Secrets on November 15, 2002, while Europe's was Hamtaro: Ham-Hams Unite! released on January 10, 2003.

Beyond the platform's official titles, as of 2025, an active online community continues to create new titles for the Game Boy and Game Boy Color through tools like GB Studio, a free and user-friendly game-building engine that simplifies the process compared to manual coding. GB Studio has been used by professional game studios like Krool Toys, who created the promotional title Grimace's Birthday for McDonald's in 2023.

=== Cartridges ===
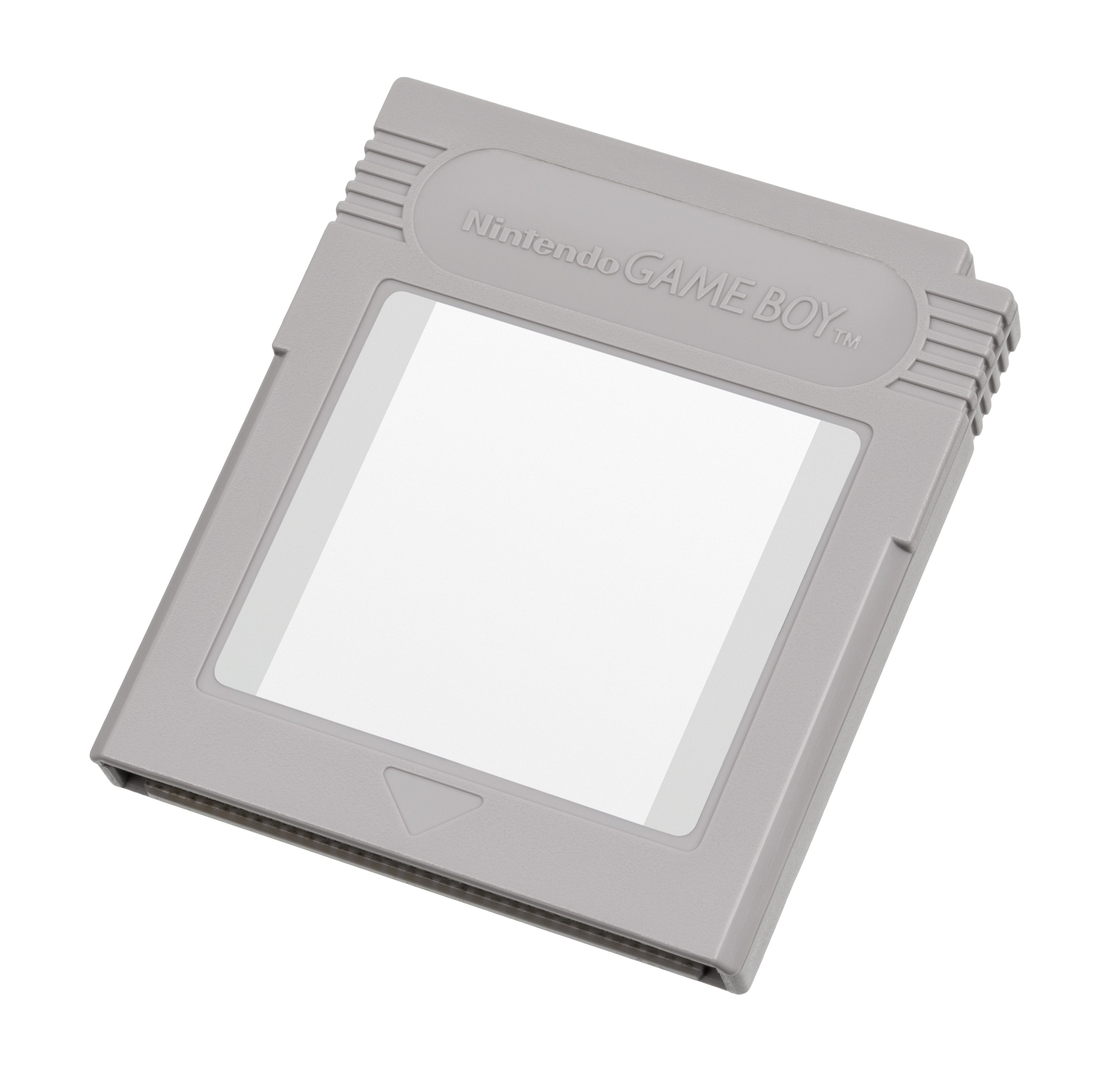
Original Game Boy Game Pak

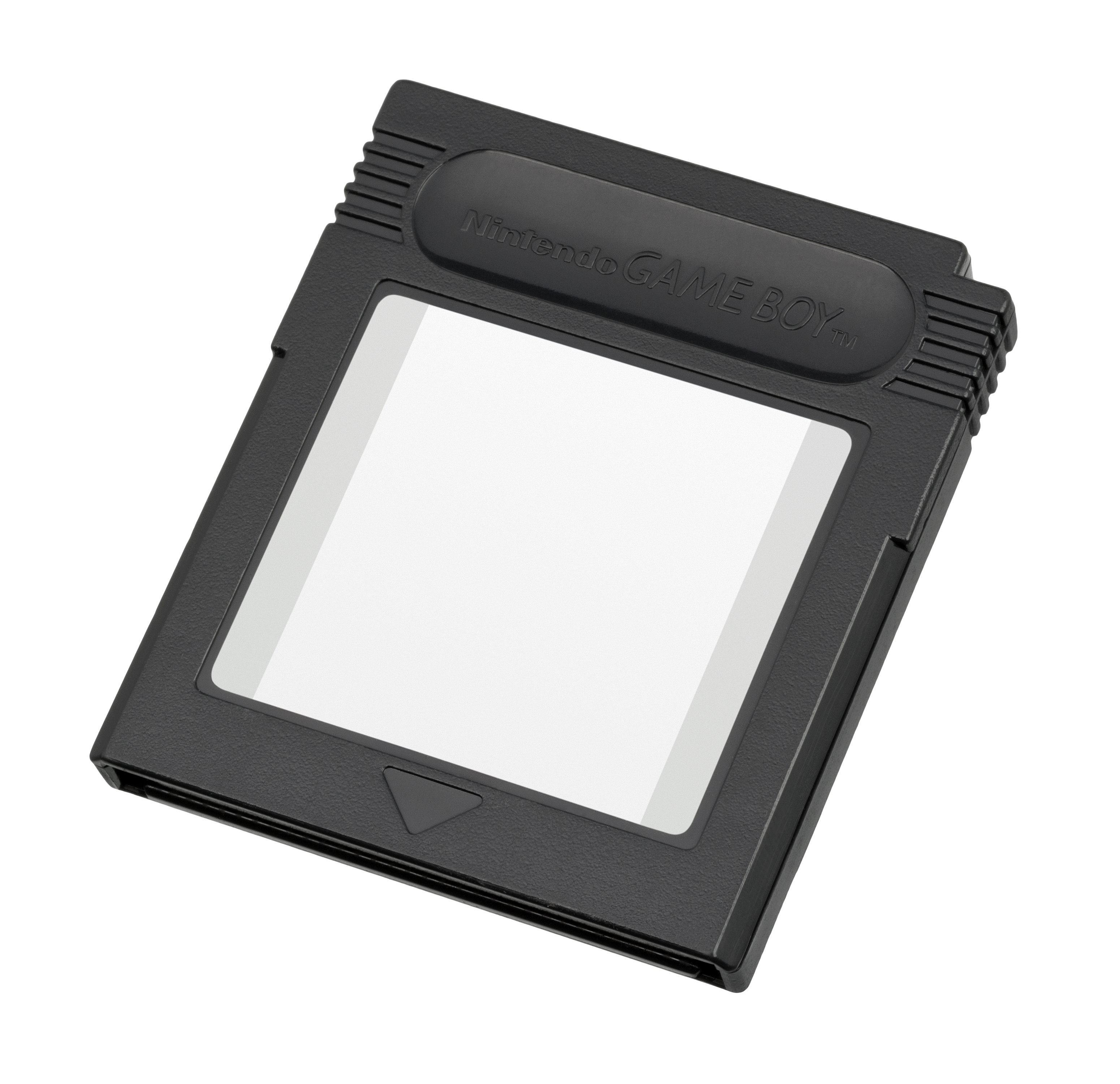
Dual Mode Game Boy Game Pak

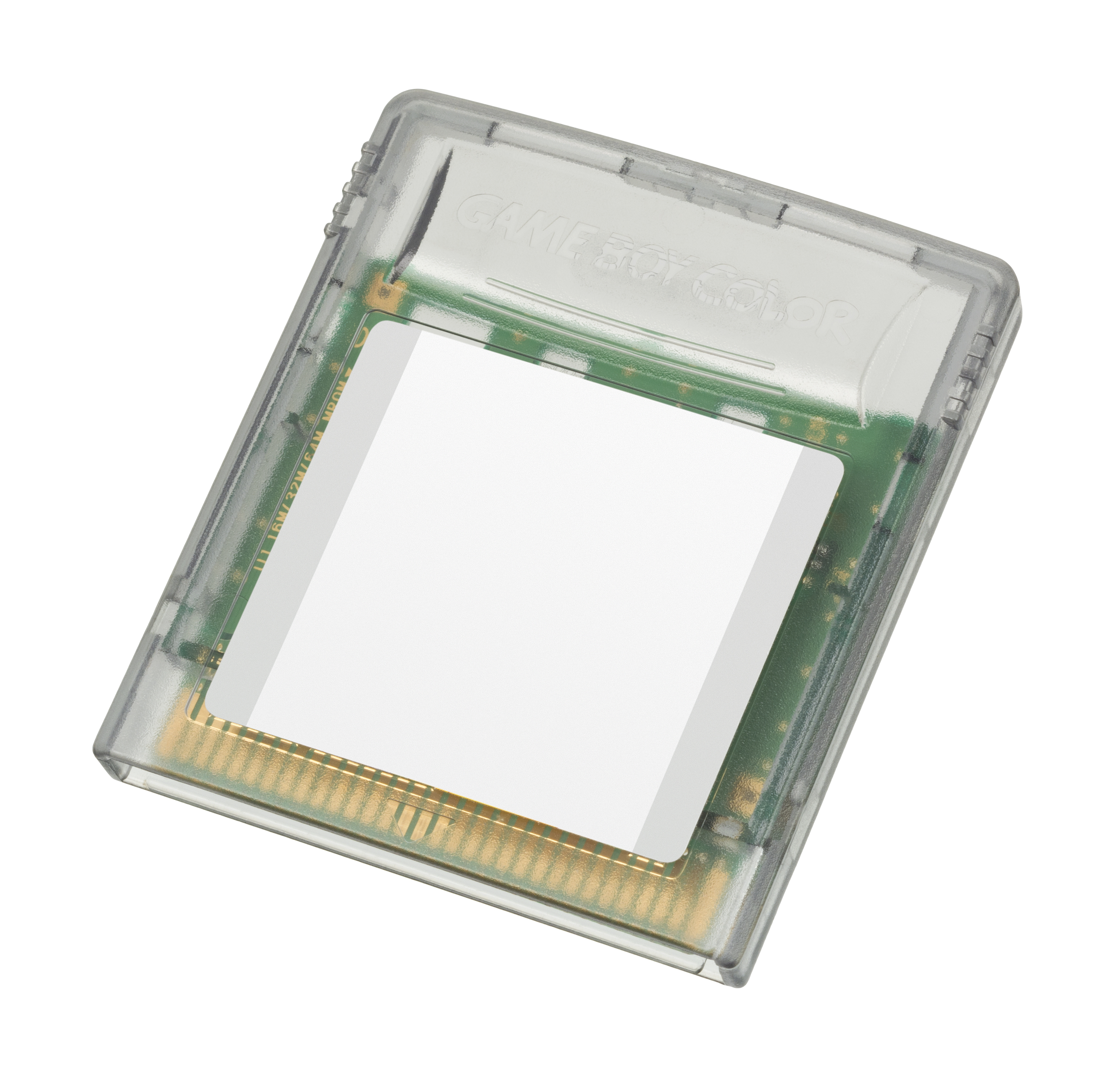
Game Boy Color Game Pak

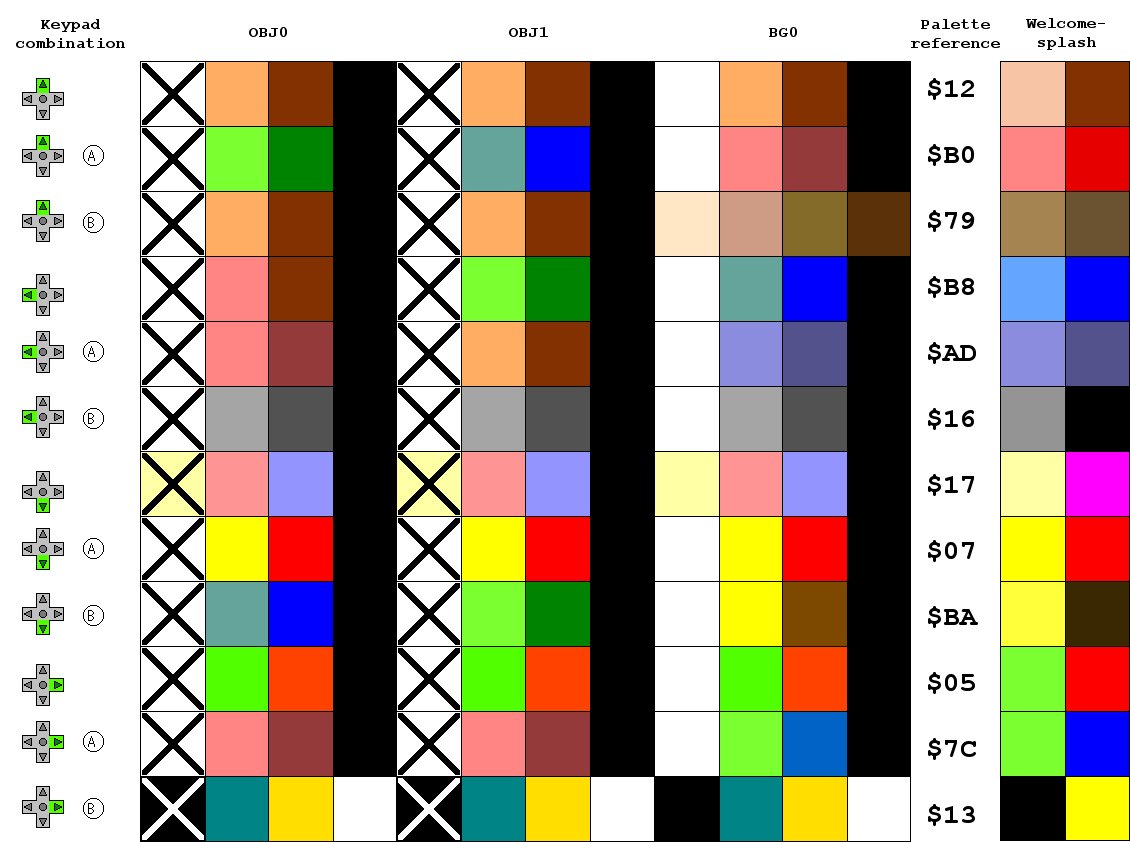
Samples of the color palettes and the key combinations to select them on an original Game Pak

Games are stored on cartridges called Game Boy Game Paks, using read-only memory (ROM) chips. Due to the limitations of the 8-bit architecture of the device, the maximum ROM size the processor could access at any time was 32 KB. Nintendo overcame this limitation with a Memory Bank Controller (MBC) in the cartridge. This chip sits between the processor and the ROM and can switch between banks of 32 KB ROM. Using this technology, Nintendo created Game Boy Color games up to 8 megabytes in size. Game Paks can also provide additional functionality to the Game Boy system. Some cartridges include up to 128 KB of RAM to increase performance, which can be battery-backed to save progress when the handheld is off, real-time clock chips can keep track of time even when the device is off, and Rumble Pak cartridges added vibration feedback to enhance gameplay.

The Game Boy Color has backward compatibility with all original Game Boy games. Three main Game Pak cartridge types for the handheld were released:

- Original Game Boy Game Pak (gray case): The original Game Boy cartridges. The Game Boy Color applies a limited color palette (often dark green) using four to ten colors to enhance games originally intended to be presented in four shades of gray. The Game Boy Color's "bootstrap" ROM was programmed with default color palettes for more than 90 titles, mainly first-party releases and popular games from other publishers. For games without a default, users can choose from 12 different palettes, including one which replicates the original Game Boy's grayscale experience, by pressing down a combination of buttons at startup.
- Dual Mode Game Pak (black case): These cartridges include both a Game Boy version and a Game Boy Color version of the game and boot the appropriate version depending on the hardware; they are not merely the same game displayed with different colors. As Dual Mode cartridges contain distinct Game Boy and Game Boy Color ROMs, the monochrome version constitutes a native release for the original Game Boy platform, rather than a Game Boy Color release made playable on earlier hardware.
- Game Boy Color Game Pak (clear case): Designed specifically for the Game Boy Color, these cartridges feature the full-color range (56 colors simultaneously out of a palette of 32,768) and benefit from the increased processing speed and memory of the Game Boy Color. Because of this reliance on newer hardware, these games are incompatible with the older monochrome Game Boy models.

== Accessories ==
Nintendo released several add-ons for the Game Boy Color, including:

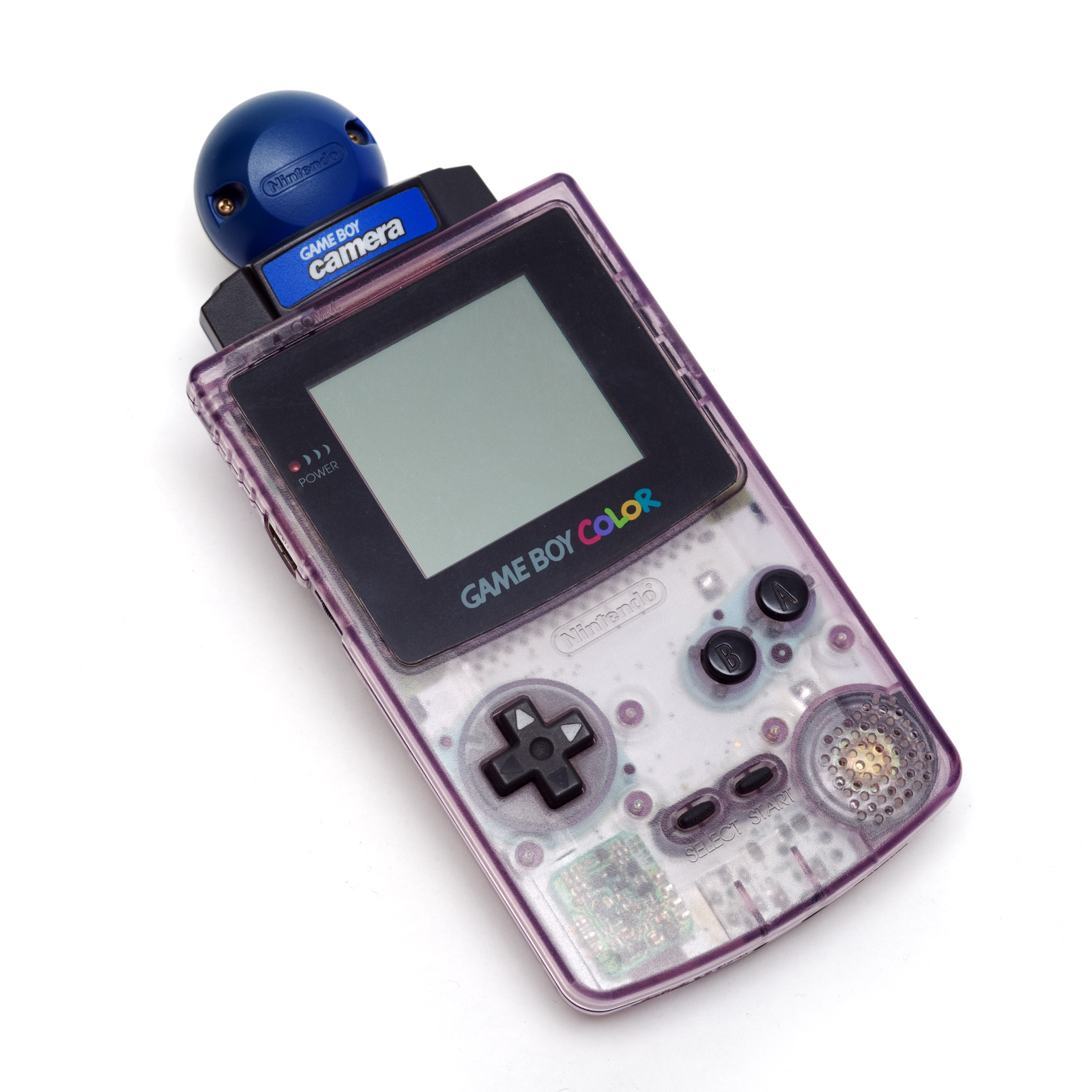
Game Boy Camera mounted in Game Boy Color

- Game Boy Camera: A cartridge-based digital camera that captures low-resolution black-and-white images and includes built-in minigames where players use their faces as avatars.
- Game Boy Printer: A thermal printer that produces hard copies of Game Boy Camera images and supports printing content from games such as Super Mario Bros. Deluxe, Donkey Kong Country, and Pokémon versions Yellow, Gold, Silver, and Crystal. Connects via a Game Link Cable.
- Game Link Cable: Enables multiplayer gaming and data transfers between Game Boy systems, notably used in the Pokémon series
- Mobile Adapter GB: Connects the console to a mobile phone, utilizing its cellular network for online interactions via the Mobile System GB service, most notably for Pokémon Crystal. Limited game support and high costs led to low adoption. The service ended on December 18, 2002, and it was never released outside Japan due to wireless incompatibilities.

== Reception ==
=== Sales ===
The Game Boy and Game Boy Color were both commercially successful, selling 118.69 million units worldwide: 32.47 million in Japan, 44.06 million in the Americas, and 42.16 million in all other regions. At the time of its discontinuation in 2003, the combined sales of all Game Boy variants made it the best-selling game console of all time. In later years, its sales were surpassed by the Nintendo DS, PlayStation 2 and Nintendo Switch, making it the fourth-best-selling console the second-best-selling handheld of all time, as of 2024.

Sales of the Game Boy Color were strong at launch. Nintendo of America reported a sale of one million units from launch to December 1998, and two million by July 1999. Retail chains in the United States reported unexpectedly high demand for the console, with executives of FuncoLand reporting "very pleasant and unpredicted" sales and Electronics Boutique stating "the entire Game Boy Color line just exploded, including accessories" upon release. Faced with high worldwide demand and competitive retail pricing, retailers such as CompUSA sold out of Game Boy Color stock in the weeks before the 1998 Christmas season. Sales of the device were in part driven by the success of Pokémon Gold and Silver and Pokémon Crystal, with combined sales of 29.5 million units, making them one of the best selling-video games of all time.

=== Critical reception ===
Reception of the Game Boy Color was positive, with critics praising the addition of color and improved clarity of the display.

Affiliated publications such as Total Games praised the handheld for its "bright, colorful picture that can be viewed in direct light", backward compatibility features preserving the "vast catalogue of original Game Boy games", and improved technical performance. British magazine Computer and Video Games praised the Game Boy Color for making the Game Boy library of games "look better than ever – everything is crystal clear, bright and in colour". Writing for GameSpot, Chris Johnston stated that the display was "crystal clear" and free of motion blur, stating that Tetris DX was the "killer app" of the launch titles on the platform.

Milder reviews included those by Arcade, who said that while that the colors were "very impressive" they were "not as eyeball-popping as you might have hoped for [...] it's mostly seaweed greens, rusty browns, timid yellows and the like". They concluded that "nothing about [the Game Boy Color] is very radical" but said the device was "Game Boy as it always should have been". Reviewers pointed out other drawbacks including that the system was still using an 8-bit architecture when competitors had moved onto 16-bit handheld systems and that the non-backlit screen required that the user be in a well lit area.

=== Legacy ===
Commentary on the legacy of the Game Boy Color has been shaped by the perception that the handheld was as an incremental and transitional upgrade of the Game Boy rather than a completely new device. Author Jeff Ryan noted the Game Boy Color had a reputation as a "legacy machine" that found success mostly due to its backward compatibility, as "few wanted to lose all the Dr. Mario and Pokémon cartridges they had amassed over the years." Quoted in Retro Gamer, Blitz Games Studios developer Bob Pape acknowledged that although "backwards compatibility more or less defined (the) Game Boy Color", the handheld "ticked all the right boxes with regards to size, battery life, reliability and most importantly backwards compatibility".

Positive assessments of the legacy of the Game Boy Color have focused on the merits of its game library, particularly for its third-party and import titles. Travis Fahs of IGN noted while "the Game Boy Color's life was relatively brief", it "built up a small library of excellent games", including Wario Land 3 and Pokémon Gold and Silver, and a "unique" and "previously unheard of" line of successful third-party games, including Dragon Warrior Monsters, Metal Gear Solid and Yu-Gi-Oh! Dark Duel Stories. Ashley Day of Retro Gamer noted that the handheld had an "overlooked" status, stating "the Game Boy Color (has) an unfair reputation as the one Nintendo handheld with few worthwhile titles, but this simply isn't the case...returning to the Game Boy Color now reveals a wealth of great games that you never knew existed, especially those available on import."

== See also ==
- List of Game Boy accessories
