= Grimace (character) =

McDonald's fictional mascot character

- First appearance: November 1971
- Created by: McDonald's Corporation
- Portrayed by: Patty Saunders (1971–1983); Mauri Bernstein (1980s commercials); Terry Castillo-Faass (1983–2000)
- Voiced by: Lennie Weinrib (1971–1986); Frank Welker (1986–2003); Larry Moran (occasional); Kevin Michael Richardson

In-universe information
- Species: Grimace
- Gender: Male
- Occupation: McDonaldland character
- Affiliation: McDonaldland
- Relatives: Grandma Winky; Aunt Millie; Aunt Tillie; Uncle O'Grimacey
- Home: Grimace Island

Grimace is a fictional character and mascot used in advertising by the McDonald's fast food restaurant chain. A large, rounded, purple anthropomorphic creature with short arms and legs, Grimace first appeared in November 1971 as part of McDonald's McDonaldland advertising campaign. Originally introduced as a villain known as "Evil Grimace," the character was quickly reimagined as a friendly good natured figure and became one of McDonald's most recognisable mascots alongside Ronald McDonald.

In 2023, Grimace became a widespread internet phenomenon after McDonald's released a limited edition "Grimace Shake," and the character experienced a further resurgence of cultural prominence in 2024 when his ceremonial first pitch at Citi Field was associated with a dramatic winning streak by the New York Mets.

== History ==
=== Creation and Evil Grimace ===
Grimace made his first appearance in November 1971 as part of the newly launched McDonaldland advertising campaign, which McDonald's created to appeal to young children. In this original form, the character was known as "The Evil Grimace" and was depicted as a large, scaly creature with four arms in two pairs whose sole purpose was to steal milkshakes and soft drinks from the residents of McDonaldland.

=== Redesign and McDonaldland ===
Following the early negative response to Evil Grimace, McDonald's stripped away his extra pair of arms and transformed him into a soft, rounded, two armed creature with a gentle, good natured personality. Now Grimace was repositioned as one of Ronald McDonald's closest friends rather than a foil.

== Identity ==
There has been decades of fan speculation about Grimace's true nature. Theories range from a living milkshake to an amorphous blob. McDonald's has confirmed that Grimace is intended to represent a giant anthropomorphic taste bud.

== See also ==
- McDonaldland
- Ronald McDonald
