= RoboCop: Alpha Commando =

- Genre: Cyberpunk; Superhero
- Created by: Michael Miner; Edward Neumeier
- Developed by: Eric Lewald; Julia Lewald
- Directed by: Larry Houston
- Voices of: David Sobolov; Jay Brazeau
- Theme music composer: Carl Johnson
- Composer: Carl Johnson
- Countries of origin: United States; Canada
- Original language: English
- No. of seasons: 1
- No. of episodes: 40

Production
- Executive producers: Jonathan Dern; Jay Firestone; Paul Sabella
- Producers: Larry Houston; Victor Dal Chele
- Running time: 30 minutes
- Production companies: Fireworks Entertainment; Metro-Goldwyn-Mayer Animation; Orion Pictures

Original release
- Network: Syndication
- Release: September 7, 1998 – February 3, 1999

RoboCop: Alpha Commando is an animated television series based on the RoboCop franchise, and the second animated production to feature the character, following on from RoboCop. Produced by Metro-Goldwyn-Mayer Animation for Orion Pictures in association with Fireworks Entertainment, the series was syndicated by The Summit Media Group for one season of forty episodes, which aired from September 7, 1998 until February 3, 1999.

== Synopsis ==
The series is set in the year 2030 (2020 in the pilot episode), and deals with RoboCop being reactivated after five years offline to assist a federal high-tech group, "Alpha Division" in their vigilance and struggle against DARC (Directorate for Anarchy, Revenge, and Chaos), a highly advanced terrorist organization, and other forces of evil, whenever that may be, globally or nationally.

The series shared many of the same writers who had contributed to the 1980s animated series, but had even less in common with the films or television canon that it was based on: RoboCop has numerous gadgets in his body that were never in the film, such as roller skates and a parachute. The absence of Anne Lewis was never explained. Besides RoboCop / Alex J. Murphy himself, Sgt. Reed is the only character from the movies to be present in the series.

The show also suffers from major continuity errors: during the first episodes, RoboCop's son is shown in flashback memories and appears to be around 10; however, he later appears to be exactly of the same age and even wearing the same clothing. The names of RoboCop's wife and son were also changed to Susan and Richie; however, this is explained in episode 10: after Alex Murphy became RoboCop, his family was forced to change their identity to keep RoboCop's enemies from locating them.

Unlike the movies, and previous TV incarnations, RoboCop never takes off his helmet in Alpha Commando.

== Voice cast ==
- David Sobolov as RoboCop
- Akiko Morison as Agent Nancy Miner
- Dean Haglund as Dr. Cornelius Neumeier
- Blu Mankuma as Sergeant Reed (Note: Mankuma also voiced Sergeant Parks in RoboCop: The Series, who serves as that show's version of Reed.)
- Campbell Lane as The Voice of Alpha Prime
- Jim Byrnes as Mr. Brink / DARC Leader
- Saffron Henderson as Additional Voices

== Crew ==
- Executive story editors: Eric Lewald and Julia Lewald
- Writers: Cary Bates, Larry Braman, Carter Crocker, Steve Cuden, Mark Edens, Michael Edens, Adam Gilad, Sam Graham, Chris Hubbell, Peter Hunziker, Gary Stewart Kaplan, Ann Knapp, Eric Lewald, Julia Lewald, Steven Melching, Martha Moran, Richard Mueller, Cynthia Riddle, Erica Rothschild, Bruce Reid Schaefer, Douglas Sloan, Richard Stanley, Jan Strnad, Larry Swerdlove, Bruce Talkington, Len Uhley, Brooks Wachtel, Len Wein, Russ Weiderspahn
- Produced and directed by Larry Houston

== Episodes ==
1. Justice Reborn: Part 1
2. Justice Reborn: Part 2
3. Justice Reborn: Part 3
4. Doppelganger
5. Town of Tomorrow
6. Cyber-Fagin
7. Plague on Ice
8. Robo Racer
9. The Hermanator
10. Robopop
11. The Weakest Link
12. Really, Really Big Shoo
13. A Pretty Girl Is Like a Malady
14. Francesca's Quest
15. Power Play
16. Deep Trouble
17. Maxsop 4
18. Oh Tannenbaum Whoa Tannenbaum!
19. We'll Always Have Paris
20. Best Friends
21. Garden of Evil
22. Robodog
23. Brawl in the Family
24. Cop Games
25. H-2-Uh-Oh
26. Inside Out
27. The ERG and I
28. Survival of the Fittest
29. While You Were Sleeping
30. Return of the Hermanator
31. Family Reunion: Part 1
32. Family Reunion: Part 2
33. Small Packages
34. Head Games
35. DARC Secrets
36. Thank You Very Mulch
37. Father's Day
38. Out of the Dark
39. Das Re-Boot
40. Talk About the Weather
