= RoboCop: Prime Directives =

2001 Canadian television series

- Genre: Action/Adventure; Cyberpunk
- Written by: Brad Abraham and Joseph O'Brien
- Directed by: Julian Grant
- Starring: Page Fletcher
- Country of origin: Canada
- Original language: English
- No. of episodes: 4

Production
- Running time: 90 minutes (each)
- Production companies: Fireworks Entertainment; MGM Television

Original release
- Network: Space
- Release: January 4 – January 25, 2001

RoboCop: Prime Directives is a Canadian cyberpunk TV miniseries released in 2001. It is a spin-off from the RoboCop franchise. The series, created by Fireworks Entertainment, consists of four feature-length episodes: Dark Justice, Meltdown, Resurrection and Crash and Burn. All four episodes have been released on DVD. Page Fletcher stars as Officer Alex Murphy / RoboCop.

== Production ==
Promotional poster image for RoboCop: Prime Directives created for the miniseries

Fireworks Entertainment stated that they wanted to make use of the TV rights to RoboCop before they expired, and thus ordered that Prime Directives be made, selecting Julian Grant to direct. Grant had a reputation for finishing projects ahead of schedule and under budget. He, in turn, picked Joseph O'Brien and Brad Abraham to write the series. Richard Eden, who played the role of RoboCop during the 1994 television series, was approached to reprise the role for this series, but negotiations broke down for an unspecified reason.

The previous incarnation of RoboCop was the family-friendly TV series from 1994. Grant had no interest in perpetuating this approach, and returned RoboCop to his dark, violent roots. Although Prime Directives takes place ten years after the original film, the production was not permitted to use clips from the feature films. MGM had licensed shots of Murphy's death scene from the original film for the television show to use. The creators of Prime Directives took the clip of the TV show that used the footage, recolored the shots blue, and used them in the third film in the series, Resurrection.

== Cast ==
- Page Fletcher as Officer Alex Murphy / RoboCop
- Maurice Dean Wint as Commander John T. Cable / RoboCable
- Maria Del Mar as OCP Executive Sara Cable
- Anthony Lemke as OCP Executive James Murphy
- Leslie Hope as Ann R. Key
- Geraint Wyn Davies as David Kaydick
- Kevin Jubinville as OCP Executive Damian Lowe
- Anthony J. Mifsud as Chuck Conflagration
- Eugene Clark as Carver RH
- Marni Thompson as Abby Normal
- Françoise Yip as Lexx Icon

Prior to being cast, Fletcher had not seen the RoboCop films, and no effort was made to mimic Peter Weller's original movements. Fletcher instead worked out a RoboCop movement system for himself that he felt was appropriate for where the character was, physically and emotionally.

=== Continuity ===
Prime Directives takes place ten years after RoboCop. This series is largely considered an alternative reality to the films as major events of the second and third films and the television series are almost completely ignored. In contrast to the events shown in the films, Delta City is developed and OCP is not dissolved. In the theatrical movie series, Murphy is publicly revealed to have been converted into RoboCop and openly uses his legally deceased name, whereas in this series, Murphy's identity remains secret until the fourth episode, in which he is legally recognized as Police Commander Alex Murphy, formerly known as Robocop Model 01.

O'Brien stated, "there's nothing in PD that significantly contradicts those other versions. The reasoning behind setting our story ten years later was to just give ourselves some distance, creatively and temporally, to tell our tale, and not out of any disrespect for those earlier incarnations, nor the people responsible for them".

In regards to the character of Anne Lewis, O'Brien went on to say: "As far as we were concerned Anne Lewis is dead. Whether this happened in RoboCop 3 or not we leave to the discretion of the individual viewer."

== Plot ==
Ten years after the events of RoboCop, RoboCop has become outdated and tired. Delta City (formerly Detroit) is now considered the safest place on Earth, and he is no longer viewed as particularly necessary.

The first half of the series focuses on Alex Murphy's former partner, John T. Cable, who is slain by RoboCop after his system is hacked to program him to terminate Cable. Cable is then resurrected as a cyborg in most aspects identical to the RoboCop model, save for color and the addition of a second sidearm. "RoboCable" is sent to destroy RoboCop, but after several battles, Cable is convinced to ally with Murphy. Meanwhile, OCP (on the verge of bankruptcy) is taken over by a scheming executive, Damian Lowe, who manages to murder the entire board of directors. To bring OCP back, he plans to use an artificial intelligence called SAINT to automate the entire city.

The second half of the series introduces Dr. David Kaydick, who plans to introduce a "bio-tech" virus called "Legion" to wipe out not only Delta City but all life on the planet, infecting computers and people alike. He takes control of RoboCable by planting a chip in him that causes him pain or death, at Kaydick's discretion. RoboCop receives aid from a group of tech thieves led by Ann R. Key, who are determined to stop Kaydick, and RoboCop's own son, James—now fully grown and aware of his father's fate. RoboCop and his rag-tag band race to stop Kaydick from infiltrating OCP tower and activating SAINT, which would presumably kill almost all humans. During the confrontation, RoboCop and James reconcile with each other, and manage to rekindle RoboCable's previous personality. Key and Kaydick both die during a confrontation with each other. Using James's EMP device, and having shut down RoboCop, RoboCable and Legion are terminated. RoboCop gets rebooted without his previous OCP restriction programming (as well as restoring his identity as "Alex Murphy" as opposed to an OCP product number) or his prime directives. After viewing a goodbye message left by Cable, Murphy returns to active duty to stop the resultant crime in Delta City due to the EMP pulse blacking out the city, deciding that he will follow his three prime directives: Serve the public trust, protect the innocent, and uphold the law.

In the epilogue, Murphy and his allies form the Prime Directives foundation while OCP is disgraced publicly and facing thousands of indictments and a multi-trillion-dollar class action lawsuit.

== Episodes ==
#	Name	Runtime	Original airdate
1	Dark Justice	95 minutes	January 4, 2001
2	Meltdown	95 minutes	January 11, 2001
3	Resurrection	95 minutes	January 18, 2001
4	Crash and Burn	95 minutes	January 25, 2001

== DVD release ==
In 2002, the complete miniseries was released in the UK on Region 2 by Prism Leisure. Delta Visual Entertainment reissued RoboCop: Prime Directives on DVD in the UK on November 17, 2008.

Lionsgate Home Entertainment released the entire four-part miniseries on DVD in Region 1 in 2003, in four separate releases. All four DVDs were re-released in June 2011.

== Reception ==
The return to darkly satirical, violent storytelling (unlike the family-friendly approach taken as of RoboCop: The Series) was welcomed. The special effects, locations, action sequences and overall production value have been criticized as reflecting a low budget, a common slight on TV productions of that period.

With virtually no commercial promotion, Prime Directives premiered in the United States on the Sci Fi Channel to lackluster ratings. Despite its poor ratings, it easily recouped its production costs through foreign sales, turning a substantial profit before broadcast and became a regular fixture on Canada's Space.
