= Thomas Rimmer =

Thomas Rimmer may refer to:

- Thomas Rimmer (actor) (born 1980), New Zealand actor
- Thomas Rimmer (RAF officer) (born 1948), British air martial
