= Puha and Pakeha =

Single by Rod Derrett
- Released: 1965
- Recorded: 1965
- Genre: Novelty, Comedy
- Length: 3:17
- Label: His Master's Voice
- Songwriter: Rod Derrett

"Puha and Pakeha" is a 1960s New Zealand novelty song, written and performed by Rod Derrett. Darkly humorous in nature, it is about Māori people in early New Zealand preparing 'boil-up' meals of pūhā (a leafy vegetable that grows in the wild) and Pākehā (New Zealanders of European descent).

In 2004, a complaint was laid with the Broadcasting Standards Authority that the song was culturally insensitive to Pākehā. In its ruling, the BSA said that it could not be interpreted as such, and that it was "clearly humorous".

The song was re-released on iTunes in October 2012 to promote the comedy horror film Fresh Meat.

== See also ==
- Cannibalism in popular culture
