= Fresh Meat (2012 film) =

New Zealand film

- Theatrical release poster
- Directed by: Danny Mulheron
- Written by: Briar Grace-Smith; Brad Abraham; Joseph O'Brien
- Produced by: Dave Gibson
- Starring: Temuera Morrison; Kate Elliot; Nicola Kawana; Hanna Tevita; Jack Sergent-Shadbolt; Leand Macadaan
- Cinematography: Simon Baumfield
- Edited by: Paul Sutorius
- Release dates: 15 October 2012 (Hawaii Film Festival); 25 October 2012 (New Zealand)
- Running time: 91 minutes
- Country: New Zealand
- Language: English

Fresh Meat is a 2012 New Zealand horror comedy film about a modern-day family of Māori who are taken hostage by a gang of criminals. It stars Temuera Morrison and Kate Elliot. It is Danny Mulheron's directorial debut. The film had its world premiere at the 32nd Hawaii International Film Festival on 15 October 2012. It had its New Zealand premiere on 25 October.

== Plot ==
Rina Crane is a teenage student experimenting sexually with her fellow female students in the shower before being picked up from school by her father Hemi, an associate professor dissatisfied with not being made a full professor due to perceived discrimination against Māori natives. His wife, Rina's mother Margaret, is a famous and successful food guru. The parents' relationship is strained because Hemi believes Margaret had an affair with one of her associates which is left unclear as to whether this is the case or just a result of his paranoia. Rina's brother Glenn is not yet home. When Rina finds a human hand in a dish inside the refrigerator looking as though it has been prepared to be eaten, she is terrified, and rather than acting surprised, her parents merely look as though she hasn't yet had the situation explained.

Meanwhile, Richie Tan, a criminal being transported in a police van, is busted out by his brother Paulie and Richie's girlfriend Gigi, who have hired explosives 'expert' Johnny who manages to flip the police van over and while successfully extracting Richie, injures him and causes massive tension among everyone in the group. In order to evade police and lay low, they crash the van they make their getaway in into the Cranes' open garage and hold the family at gunpoint. Johnny happens to be a fan of Margaret's and monopolizes her while Richie takes Rina to her room to exploit her sexually. He dresses in her bra and panties and while she pretends to be interested in him, bites his crotch until it bleeds, forcing the other criminals and family back into the same area. Gigi is furious with Richie for attempting to cheat on her and by now has started to flirt with Rina, who attempts to persuade her to turn on her criminal friends.

Paulie finds a trapdoor in the kitchen and opens it, and is instantly killed by a booby trap inside, after which his friends discover it leads to an underground butchery where Rina's parents and brother have been ritually killing, slicing up and preparing for consumption the bodies of other human beings. With their cannibalism revealed, the family turn viciously upon their captors and brutally kill all but Gigi who is knocked out but will eventually be eaten as well. Rina is horrified and refuses to go along with her family's insane tradition inspired by historical events her father studies. A boy from school who fancies her drops in unannounced as the family sits down to dinner and Rina's parents continue to attempt to persuade her, talking her friend into unwittingly eating a testicle in spite of his vegetarianism. Rina tries forcefully to get him to leave but he sees other intact body parts on his plate and realises what has just happening, causing her family to murder him as well.

A police officer going door to door to warn citizens about the group of criminals on the loose in their area manages to get inside the house after Rina acts suspiciously, causing him to also be murdered and subsequently an entire SWAT team arrives at the house. By now Rina's father has gone completely unhinged and, after Glenn fails to properly prepare one of the bodies as the ritual demands, their father slices Glenn's chest open and rips out his beating heart, taking a bite out of it, believing that feasting on the heart, flesh and blood of his own offspring will render him immortal. Margaret, now realizing Hemi was practicing their religious rites selfishly, turns against him but is overpowered and used as a human shield against Rina. Gigi awakens and comes to her aid but cannot attack Hemi with Margaret hostage, and when they try, she loses an arm to a badly aimed slice with a butcher's knife.

The police start shooting into the house and Hemi is obsessed with devouring Rina, biting her and drinking some of her blood, but Gigi saves her and is injured in the process. Rina stands up to him, now the sole survivor of the family apart from him, and turns on all the gas in the kitchen, preparing to blow the house up to stop her father. The police shoot a gas grenade into the house disorienting them and just as another shot into the house is about to ignite the gas, Gigi, disguised as one of the SWAT team, grabs Rina and ejects both of them through a window, leaving Hemi to be incinerated. Gigi and Rina kiss, and as they observe the ruins of the house, a charred hand reaches up and grabs Gigi's arm, leaving it unknown whether Hemi merely survived or is truly immortal.

== Cast ==
The Crane family

- Temuera Morrison as Hemi Crane: The head of the family.
- Nicola Kawana as Margaret Crane: Hemi's wife.
- Hanna Tevita as Rina Crane: The teenage daughter.
- Kahn West as Glenn Crane: The teenage son.

The Tan Brothers gang

- Leand Macadaan as Richie Tan: The leader of the gang.
- Ralph Hilaga as Paulie Tan: Richie's brother.
- Kate Elliot as Gigi: Richie's girlfriend.
- Jack Sergent-Shadbolt as Johnny: The bumbling accomplice.

Other featured cast

- Will Robertson as Shaun Armstrong
- James Ashcroft as Katene
- Richard Knowles as Nisbet
- Andrew Foster as Gallup
- Phil Grieve as Strop
- Thomas Rimmer as Wee Willy

== See also ==
- Cannibalism in popular culture
- Puha and Pakeha
- We Are What We Are, an American remake of a 2010 Mexican horror film of the same name with a similar but more serious premise.
