= Brad Abraham =

Canadian screenwriter, producer and author

- Born: Ottawa, Ontario, Canada
- Occupations: Screenwriter; Author; Journalist; Producer; Comic book creator
- Years active: 2000–present
- Website: bradabraham.com

Brad Abraham is a Canadian-born screenwriter, author, journalist, producer, and comic book creator. His past film and television work include Stonehenge Apocalypse, Robocop: Prime Directives, I Love Mummy, Fresh Meat, and the National Film Board of Canada-produced Hoverboy. He was also an uncredited writer on the remake of the 1970s slasher classic Black Christmas. He is also the creator and writer of Space Goat Productions acclaimed comic book series Mixtape, and author of the novel Magicians Impossible (2017).

== Filmography ==
Year	Title	Role
2000	Robocop: Prime Directives	Co-Scr
2000	Hoverboy	Producer
2002	I Love Mummy	Scr, Two Episodes
2006	Black Christmas	Co-scr, Uncredited
2010	Stonehenge Apocalypse	Co-Scr
2012	Fresh Meat	Co-Story
