= Liberty & Bash =

- Directed by: Myrl A. Schreibman
- Written by: Tina Plackinger, Myrl A. Schreibman
- Produced by: Douglas Forsmith
- Starring: Lou Ferrigno; Miles O'Keeffe; Mitzi Kapture; Lynette Mettey; Richard Eden; Cheryl Paris; Gary Conway; Charles Dierkop
- Cinematography: Thomas F. Denove
- Edited by: Lee Dragu
- Music by: Sasha Matson
- Distributed by: Shapiro-Glickenhaus Entertainment
- Release date: October 1989
- Running time: 92 min
- Country: United States
- Language: English

Liberty & Bash is a 1989 action film starring Miles O'Keeffe and Lou Ferrigno as Vietnam war buddies who team up to rid their community of drugs.

== Cast ==
- Lou Ferrigno as Bash
- Miles O'Keeffe as Liberty
- Mitzi Kapture as Sarah
- Lynette Mettey as Terry
- Richard Eden as a Jesse
- Cheryl Paris as Melissa
- Gary Conway as Commissioner Jordan
- Charles Dierkop as Mr B
- Michael Long as Cop #2

== Plot ==
Miles O'Keeffe and Lou Ferrigno star as Vietnam war buddies Liberty and Bash, who team up to rid their community of drugs. When Jesse (Richard Eden) is murdered, Liberty hunts them down with Bash to get them back for killing Jesse. Their friendship began in a time of war, when Liberty and Bash stood united against one enemy in Central America. Now, once again, the battle lines have been drawn and another war rages. It's up to them to save their oldest friend's life.
