= RoboCop (character) =

Fictional cybernetically enhanced police officer

- RoboCop character
- Peter Weller as RoboCop in RoboCop (1987)
- First appearance: RoboCop (1987)
- Created by: Edward Neumeier; Michael Miner
- Portrayed by: Various: Peter Weller (RoboCop and RoboCop 2); Robert Burke (RoboCop 3); Richard Eden (RoboCop); Page Fletcher (RoboCop: Prime Directives); Joel Kinnaman (RoboCop)
- Voiced by: Various: Robert Bockstael (RoboCop); David Sobolov (RoboCop: Alpha Commando); Peter Weller (Mortal Kombat 11, Rogue City)

In-universe information
- Full name: Alex James Murphy
- Nicknames: Murphy; Robo
- Nationality: American

Officer Alex James Murphy (designation number: OCP Crime Prevention Unit 001), commonly known as RoboCop, is a fictional cybernetically enhanced officer of the Detroit Police Department and the titular protagonist of the Robocop franchise. Murphy is killed in the line of duty, and is resurrected and transformed into the cyborg law enforcement unit RoboCop by the megacorporation Omni Consumer Products (OCP). In the original screenplay, he is referred to as Robo by creators Edward Neumeier and Michael Miner.

== Concept and creation ==
Edward Neumeier's script and idea were rejected by many studios, and the name was thought as an "unsuitable" movie. The character was inspired by sources including Iron Man and Judge Dredd.

=== 1987 costume ===
Rob Bottin was tasked with designing the RoboCop outfit. He had not previously designed a robot and struggled to think of films where a robot portrayed a main character throughout. He looked at the Star Wars film series, particularly the C-3PO character. The C-3PO costume consisted of stiff costumed extremities with a cloth midsection, which made movement and action scenes difficult. Bottin was also influenced by robots in the science fiction films Metropolis (1927) and The Day the Earth Stood Still (1951).

Bottin's first concept was described as like a Marvel Comics superhero, based on his own appreciation for comic books. He developed around 50 different designs based on feedback from Verhoeven who pushed for a more machine-like character. Bottin said the designs inevitably returned to more human because the actor had to move while wearing it. Bottin briefly fell out with Verhoeven over the latter's criticism of his designs. Verhoeven said the outfit design was one of the project's most difficult aspects because he had unrealistic expectations about what he wanted after reading Japanese science fiction manga. He admitted that he was wrong and that it took him too long to realize it, contributing to the outfit's delayed completion. Bottin's final design features lines that imply a constant forward momentum and speed. Bottin spent ten months designing the suit.

The RoboCop outfit development was unprecedented, and both design and construction were more expensive and took longer than anticipated. Bottin and a 6-person team spent six months constructing the outfit. The outfit is effectively two suits: a flexible one made from foam latex (including the jaw, neck, gloves, abdomen, pelvis, and posterior) and painted black like cast iron; and semi- or completely rigid pieces placed over the former and made from Polyurethane (chest, limbs, and feet). Moving sections like limbs were joined with aluminum and ball bearings. The entirety of the suit is supported by an internal harness of hooks, allowing for more action-heavy movements. Bottin was unfamiliar with polyurethane and unaware that it had a terrible smell and had to be primed with toxic chemicals before painting. Bottin used fiberglass to construct the helmet to spare Weller the polyurethane smell. Seven suits were made, including a fireproof version for the gas station explosion, and damaged suits to reflect the aftermath of assaults on RoboCop. The suits weighed 25 to 80 lb (11 to 36 kg); reports vary.

Once completed, Weller tried on the costume. It took around 1.5 hours to put the outfit on. Weller was immediately frustrated because the costume was too cumbersome for him to move as he had practiced. Bottin spent 10 hours adjusting the outfit to help alleviate Weller's concerns. Weller's training with Mona Yakim had developed a liquid-movement style with a stiff staccato end but this was no longer possible. He also struggled to see through the thin helmet visor and interact or grab while wearing the gloves. After several days of struggle, Yakim was called to the set and helped Weller develop a slower, more deliberate movement style. Weller's experience in the outfit was made worse by warm weather, causing him to lose up to 3 lb (1.4 kg) in sweat per day. The lower body of the outfit could not be worn in vehicles because it could not fit.

When RoboCop removes his helmet, a trick drill with a hollow shaft makes it appear that lengthy screws are emerging from his head. Dupuis and Mixon applied Weller's prosthetics once RoboCop's face is revealed. A fiberglass skull was fitted to the back of his head and blended with rubber prosthetics into Weller's skin. The process took between 6 and 8 hours and lasted 5 hours before the rubber began to fail. The pair found the process difficult because Weller's smooth skin could not conceal seams between real and false skin. Stuntman Russell Towery served as Weller's stunt double; he walked through the flames of the exploded gas station and was injured by an explosive during the first fight between RoboCop and ED-209 in OCP that threw him across the hallway. A 9 in (23 cm) stop motion RoboCop figure was used once during the same scene, to show RoboCop making ED-209 shoot its own arm.

A Beretta 93R, modified by Randy Moore, was used for RoboCop's Auto-9 gun. The gun was adjusted to allow it to fire blanks, the barrel was extended, and the grips made larger, and vents were cut into the side to create a multi-directional burst of fire with every three-shot burst. RoboCop's leg holster was made using a leg mold and cable-controlled by three operators, and three separate arms were made for different functions: an articulated, cable-controlled arm shown moving during RoboCop's creation; one with a spring-loaded spike attached to a metal frame and held near Weller when RoboCop accesses the police database; and one built like a battering-ram to smash a television screen in Murphy's home.

== Appearances ==
=== RoboCop ===
The megacorporation Omni Consumer Products (OCP) holds a contract to fund and run the Detroit Police Department, with OCP's Security Concepts division providing oversight for the police. In order to supplement the overwhelmed police force, Security Concepts begins developing robotic law enforcement units. Originally, OCP Senior President Dick Jones develops a fully robotic unit called ED (Enforcement Droid)-209, with plans to secure a profitable long-term contract with the military. However, ED-209 severely malfunctions during the simulation of a disarm-and-arrest procedure and kills the test subject, even though he dropped his weapon. Ambitious junior executive Bob Morton takes this as a justified reason to go over Jones's head and pitch his "RoboCop" program directly to OCP's CEO, the "Old Man".

Morton and his team restructure the police force to deliberately place prime candidates with high aptitude and experience in law enforcement into high crime areas where death in the line of duty is much higher. Once a death occurs, the deceased officer's body will be used in the construction of a cyborg law enforcement unit (full body cybernetic/bionic prosthetic chassis), since the officers have already signed waivers allowing OCP to do whatever they please with their corpses. This unit will build upon the deceased's lifetime of on-the-street law enforcement experience by adding the fastest reflexes modern technology can offer and a memory assisted by an on-board computer.

Officer Alex Murphy is one of these candidates. He is partnered with Officer Anne Lewis, a veteran of Old Detroit, which is plagued by crime boss Clarence Boddicker and his gang. One day, Murphy and Lewis pursue Boddicker's gang in a rolling shootout following an armed robbery, chasing them to an abandoned steel mill. After they split up to search for the gang, Boddicker's henchman Joe Cox incapacitates Lewis while Murphy is captured by three of Boddicker's lieutenants: Emil Antonowsky, Leon Nash, and Steve Minh. When Boddicker shows up, he asks Murphy for his opinion of him, to which Murphy defiantly and honestly tells him, "Buddy, I think you're slime." Boddicker nonchalantly shoots off Murphy's right hand with a shotgun, then the gang members take turns blasting Murphy with shotguns, shearing off Murphy's right arm and blowing holes in every part of his body. Amazingly, Murphy survives (perhaps due to the protective body armor covering his torso), but Boddicker then executes him with a gunshot to the head. Murphy is rushed to a trauma center, where the doctors try in vain to keep him alive.

After having him legally declared dead, OCP seizes possession of Murphy, citing the release forms he signed when he joined the police force. The technicians of the RoboCop Program, led by Morton, take what is left of Murphy's face and portions of his still-living cerebrum and cerebellum and install them in a cybernetic body, in effect resurrecting him as RoboCop.

RoboCop quickly proves to be an effective weapon against crime, but he eventually begins to remember his past life as Murphy, starting with his traumatic death at the hands of Boddicker and his gang. Enraged at having had his life stolen from him, RoboCop embarks on a personal quest for vengeance as he hunts down Boddicker, resulting in the arrest or death of his entire gang. When Boddicker confesses to being in Dick Jones' employ, RoboCop attempts to arrest Jones as well. However, RoboCop's classified 'Directive 4' comes into effect, preventing him from arresting Jones. Jones admits ordering Morton's murder to RoboCop, who is subsequently damaged by an ED-209, though he manages to evade the robot. After enduring a massed attack by the technophobic Lieutenant Hedgecock and his SWAT team, RoboCop is rescued by Lewis. The two hide in an abandoned steel mill after they escape, during which RoboCop confides to Lewis about his memories of his past life. He also uses a drill brought by Lewis to remove his headpiece, showing how his "Alex Murphy" face is stretched over it. The two are attacked by Boddicker's gang, commissioned by Jones to destroy the cyborg after he realizes that his entire confession of ordering Morton's murder has been recorded. The final confrontation with Boddicker himself ends with RoboCop violently stabbing him in the throat with the computer data spike installed in his fist, finally fulfilling his revenge. RoboCop confronts Jones in the middle of an OCP board meeting, during which Jones takes the "Old Man" hostage. After admitting that he can take no action due to Directive 4, the "Old Man" fires Jones, allowing RoboCop to shoot him, since he is no longer an OCP employee. Complimenting RoboCop on his shooting skills, The Old Man asks him his name. Robocop smiles before answering, "Murphy", embracing his humanity.

=== RoboCop 2 ===
A year later, OCP is attempting to replicate the success they had with Murphy with a new "RoboCop 2" program; however, all selected candidates go insane upon activation and commit suicide or harm others, due to the severe mental strain of their new situations. RoboCop is captured and torn apart by the drug lord Cain and his gang, and his pieces are dumped in front of the police station as a message. He is reconstructed and then programmed with numerous other conflicting directives that render him virtually unable to perform his duties, as a public relations group thinks he should be more 'people-friendly'. However, his human will persevered and he shocks himself with high voltage that resets his programming and erases his new directives, leaving him free to lead a counter-attack against Cain.

To find a suitable personality for the "RoboCop 2" program, Dr. Juliette Faxx considers the criminal element in Cain, reasoning that someone with strong megalomania would relish the power of the new body instead of rejecting the new-found life, just as Murphy came through the process due to his strong sense of justice. Her plan is to use Cain's addiction to the drug Nuke to control him. Upon his clinical death, Cain's brain and spinal column are harvested and placed in a larger, more powerful cybernetic body, referred to as RoboCop 2. Ultimately, Cain's addiction to Nuke proves to be his undoing, as Lewis tempts him with a vial of the drug long enough for RoboCop to attack Cain from behind and remove his brain casing from the robot body. RoboCop smashes the brain on the pavement, eliminating Cain for good.

=== RoboCop 3 ===
On the verge of bankruptcy, OCP creates an armed force called the Urban Rehabilitators ("Rehabs" for short), under the command of Paul McDaggett. Its public purpose is to combat rising crime in Old Detroit, augmenting the ranks of the Detroit Police in apprehending violent criminals. In reality, it has been set up to forcibly relocate the residents of Cadillac Heights, killing some of them (including the parents of Nikko, a Japanese American computer whiz kid) in the process. The Rehabs gradually supersede the police, and violent crime begins to spiral out of control. The Delta City dream of former OCP CEO, "The Old Man", lives on with the help of the Japanese zaibatsu, the Kanemitsu Corporation, which has bought a controlling stake in the organisation. Kanemitsu sees the potential in the citywide redevelopment and moves forward with the plans to remove the current citizens. The company develops and uses its own ninja robots (called "Otomo") to help McDaggett and the OCP President overcome the resistance of the anti-OCP militia forces.

When RoboCop and partner Anne Lewis try to defend civilians from the Rehabs one night, Lewis is mortally wounded by McDaggett and eventually dies. Unable to fight back because of the "Fourth Directive", RoboCop is saved by members of a resistance movement and eventually joins them. Due to severe damage sustained in the shoot-out RoboCop's systems efficiency plummets, and he asks the resistance to summon Dr. Lazarus, one of the scientists who created him. Upon arrival she begins to repair him, deleting the Fourth Directive in the process. During an earlier raid on an armory the resistance has picked up a jet-pack prototype, originally intended for RoboCop's use, which Lazarus modifies and upgrades.

After recovering from his injuries RoboCop conducts a one-man campaign against the Rehabs. He finds McDaggett and attempts to subdue him, but McDaggett is able to escape. McDagget then obtains information from a disgruntled resistance member regarding the location of the resistance fighter's base. The base is then attacked by the Rehabs and most of the resistance members are either killed or taken prisoner. Nikko escapes with the help of Lazarus before she is captured and taken to the OCP headquarters as a prisoner.

RoboCop returns to the resistance base to find it abandoned. One of the Otomo ninjabots then arrives and attacks him. RoboCop experiences another power drain, and his side-arm is destroyed, but eventually he is able to overcome his opponent. Meanwhile, Nikko infiltrates the OCP building and assists Lazarus in broadcasting an improvised video, revealing that OCP is behind the outbreaks of criminality in the city and implicating them in the removal and termination of the Cadillac Heights residents. The broadcast causes OCP's stock to plunge dramatically, driving the company into total ruin.

McDaggett decides to execute an all-out strike against Cadillac Heights with the help of the Detroit City police department, but the outraged police officers refused to comply and instead defect to the resistance. As a result, McDaggett turns to hiring street gangs and hooligans to assist with his plans.

Having heard Lazarus' broadcast Robocop takes to the air using the jetpack. As the combined forces of the Rehabs and street gangs are about to wipe out the rebels and Detroit Police, RoboCop mounts an aerial assault on the attackers, leading to their defeat. He then proceeds to the OCP building and confronts the waiting McDaggett. Robocop is then attacked, and nearly defeated, by two Otomo ninjabots. Nikko and Lazarus succeed in reprogramming the ninjabots using a wireless link from a laptop computer, forcing them to attack each other. This triggers a timed self-destruct sequence in both units, forcing Robocop to flee. In igniting his jetpack, the flaming discharge hits McDaggett's legs, immobilising him. Robocop escapes with Nikko and Lazarus, leaving McDaggett to perish in the blast while attempting to stop the self-destruct devices.

As Old Detroit is being cleaned up Kanemitsu arrives and confronts RoboCop and his group, while his translator tells the OCP president on Kanemitsu's behalf that he is fired. Kanemitsu then bows to RoboCop. The deposed OCP President turns to Robocop and says "Well, I gotta hand it to ya... what do they call you? Murphy, is it?" RoboCop replies, saying "My friends call me Murphy. You call me RoboCop."

=== RoboCop: Prime Directives ===
Thirteen years after the first RoboCop was activated, OCP revives the RoboCop Program yet again. After the death of Delta City Security Commander John T. Cable, OCP uses portions of his body to create Crime Prevention Unit 002, moving back to the original elements of Morton's RoboCop Program. In a move of Corporate Espionage, this new RoboCop is activated in an attempt to eliminate his predecessor so that the conglomerate could freely participate in questionable activities. This programming is later overcome by Cable, who OCP had not remembered was a former friend, and partner, of Alex Murphy, and the two instead moved against OCP.

=== RoboCop (2014) ===
RoboCop as portrayed by Joel Kinnaman in the 2014 remake

In this reboot of the series, Alex Murphy and his partner, Jack Lewis, are attempting to arrest crime lord Antoine Vallon, unaware that he has contacts inside the department. When Lewis gets shot and is hospitalized after an undercover deal goes wrong, Murphy is badly injured when Vallon detonates a car bomb in his driveway; a subsequent medical evaluation states that Murphy has third-degree burns over eighty percent of his body, serious spinal damage left him paralyzed from the waist down, his left arm and leg had to be amputated, serious damage to the optical nerves in his left eye left him blind in that eye and he was likely to be deaf. Faced with this damage, Murphy's wife agrees for him to be made part of the new Robocop program as part of a campaign by OmniCorp's Director, Raymond Sellars. Under current regulations, the Dreyfus Act prevents robots being used for law enforcement purposes in American streets, with the Robocop program attempting to exploit a loophole by putting a human in the robotic body.

Murphy is virtually completely reconstructed with a "full-body" cybernetic humanoid chassis; his face, central nervous systems, circulatory systems, and respiratory systems are the largest part of him left intact, along with his right hand, but various chips have been implanted into his brain, as well as at least one eye being replaced, along with the rest of his body being an artificial construct that can be dismantled. However, he proves to operate at a slower rate than the drone counterparts in field simulations due to his natural hesitation when making judgements in the field. Attempting to get around this, Dr. Norton, the cyberneticist responsible for creating Murphy's implants, has a new chip installed in Murphy's brain that compensates for this by taking control of his responses in action while giving Murphy the illusion that he's still the one making the decisions. When faced with his public debut, Murphy is so overwhelmed by his emotions that Dr. Norton is forced to shut down Murphy's ability to feel emotions to prevent a psychological breakdown.

With his emotions shut down, Murphy proves to be an effective detective and police officer, quickly tracking down assorted un-arrested suspects through his access to various security systems. His inability to emotionally connect results in him avoiding contact with his wife Clara and son David. When Clara confronts Murphy about his distance, it causes the reversal of the effects of Dr. Norton's emotion augmentation, prompting Murphy to track down Vallon and his police contacts, effectively solving his own murder, only to be shut down when he attempts to force a confession out of the police chief after learning that she was one of Vallon's contacts. When Sellars attempts to use this discovery of police corruption to have RoboCops put in action on a country-wide scale and destroy the original, Norton has a crisis of conscience and not only reactivates Murphy, but admits what was done to him psychologically during the program. Murphy pursues Sellars, aided by Lewis even as he suffers damage when facing OmniCorp security, and rescues Clara and David when Sellars tries to use them as a hostage, overcoming his programming so that he can kill Sellars despite Sellars wearing an armband to identify him as a "protected asset". With the death of Sellars, Murphy is reconstructed by Norton and allowed contact with his family again.

== Characteristics ==
Police officer Alex Murphy is serving with the Detroit Police Department when its funding and administration is taken over by the private corporation, Omni Consumer Products (OCP). Murphy is a devout Irish Catholic and a mild-mannered family man, living with his wife, Ellen (Nancy in the television series, Clara in the 2014 remake), and his son, Jimmy (James Daniel "Jimmy" Murphy in RoboCop: The Series (see ep. 06, "Zone Five"), David in the 2014 remake). Murphy starts mimicking his son's television hero, T.J. Lazer, who twirled his gun whenever he took down a criminal. Murphy's psychological profile states that he was top of his class at the police academy and possesses a fierce sense of duty. This dedication explains why Murphy exhibits none of the negative attitudes and statements shared by his fellow officers when he is transferred to the Metro West Precinct, the most violent area of Old Detroit. The police dissatisfaction is the result of OCP's deliberate mismanagement, and penny-pinching, which led to the deaths of many police officers in the precinct.

=== Police file ===
Alex Murphy's police file (from the first RoboCop film) reads as follows:

OD5839484E09
Murphy, Alex J.
548 Primrose Ln,
Detroit, MI
Grade: 1 00 33

DECEASED (despite being revived as RoboCop)

Service: 7 Merit:
Miranda Award
GD Conduct
BRVRY

— RoboCop

Alex Murphy's police file (from RoboCop: The Series, in episode, Prime Suspect) reads as follows:

Officer Murphy, Alex J.

-Deceased-

OD 5839484E09

548 Primrose Ln.

Detroit. MI.

Background

Education:

- Mother Theresa Elementary School
- St. John-Paul High School
- Holy Trinity College

Church:

- St. John-Paul Cathedral

Family

- Father: Capt. Russell Murphy (Ret.)
- Mother: Dorothy Murphy
- Married: Murphy, Nancy – Housewife
- Children: Murphy, James – H. Ross Perot Junior High

Service Record

- Distinguished Service Citation
- Citations for Bravery
- Civic Duty Award
- Wounded in Line of Duty
- Purple Ribbon
- Miranda Award
- D.P.D. Medal for Heroism
- D.P.D. Medal of Valour (2)
- Marsman Ribbon, Top Gun (B)
- Rotary Policeman of the Year ('40)
- Meritorious Police Duty – Honorable Mention

— RoboCop: The Series

=== Prime Directives ===
Directive 1: Serve the public trust
Directive 2: Protect the innocent
Directive 3: Uphold the law
Directive 4: CLASSIFIED

— Prime Directives

RoboCop is programmed to follow three main "Prime Directives" (accompanied by a mysterious fourth) based on the "To Protect and to Serve" motto of the Los Angeles Police Department and many other police forces, and which are comparable with Isaac Asimov's "Three Laws of Robotics".

Depiction in original trilogy

The First Directive (Serve the Public Trust) is the moral directive programmed: it establishes RoboCop as a police civil servant in the series who assumes a subservient contract of "public's trust", and thereby considered public property. The Second and Third Directives must not conflict with the First Directive; if there is conflict, then the First Directive overrides the Second and Third Directives. RoboCop must help the civilians in any ways possible; and must protect their civil rights to life, privacy, and property from any lethal or non-lethal harm. This disables him from prosecuting, arresting, trespassing or harming innocent civilians without a warrant or probable cause, or act in any way against the public's trust. In RoboCop 3, when he was chasing McDaggett, he had to stop when several children blocked the road in order to prevent any harm. If he detects innocent bystanders, his fellow officers or criminals of minor misdemeanors are attacked or threatened; it then activates the Second Directive and Third Directive.

The Second Directive (Protect the Innocent) is the ethical directive programmed: it establishes RoboCop must exercise reverence for life, de-escalation, duty to intercede, duty to rescue, non-lethality, and the presumption of innocence at all times. The Second Directive must not conflict with the First Directive; if there is conflict, then the First Directive overrides the Second Directive. Lethal force is authorized only during life-threatening situations, and only against criminals with a history of serious felonies (i.e., murder). In RoboCop 2, RoboCop could not shoot Hob in self-defense by virtue of being a minor; this activated the Second Directive, as children are automatically assumed to be innocent.

The Third Directive (Uphold the Law) is the legal directive programmed: it establishes RoboCop as a law enforcement officer, with power of arrest, the legitimized use of force, and the obligation to "protect and serve" as required by law. The Third Directive must not conflict with the First or Second Directives; if there is conflict then the First or Second Directive(s) override(s) the Third Directive. It also forbids strike action or to request termination of employment, and disables him from directly assaulting, arresting, resisting, impeding, or harming a police officer. In RoboCop, this is specifically what prevents Murphy from killing Boddicker during a drug raid: while Boddicker had been shooting at RoboCop minutes before, he then put his gun away and tried to flee, but RoboCop caught up with him and started severely beating him (based on echoes of memory of what Boddicker did to Murphy). The badly wounded and now unarmed Boddicker begs for his life, pleads that he surrenders, and that RoboCop cannot kill him because he is a police officer – which activates the Third Directive, making RoboCop take him in alive back to the police precinct.

In RoboCop: The Series, RoboCop was able to use the Second Directive to override the Third Directive, when in a conflict whether to remove an item from evidence to save his widow, Nancy, when she was held hostage in the episode Heartbreakers.

The Fourth Directive is Jones' contribution to RoboCop's psychological profile, deliberately programmed as "hidden" and is inaccessible by RoboCop. The Fourth Directive must not conflict with the First, Second, or Third Directives; if there is conflict, then the Fourth Directive overrides all previous directives. This directive renders him physically incapable of arresting or injuring any senior OCP employee: "Any attempt to arrest a senior OCP employee results in shutdown." Jones informs RoboCop that he is an OCP product and private property, not an ordinary police officer. As a result, RoboCop is effectively a slave, unable to act against the corrupt Jones until the Old Man terminates Jones's employment with the company, allowing RoboCop to act against him. Throughout the franchise, the Fourth Directive is depicted as frequently undermining and/or conflicting with the previous three Directives. Senior OCP employees are technically "untouchable", as the company legally owns both RoboCop and all administrative branches of government within the City of Detroit; they are a corporatocracy free to operate above the law without consequence.

In RoboCop 3, Directive Four is declassified and reworded as "Never oppose an OCP officer". It is eliminated so that RoboCop could avenge Lewis's death.

Deletion of Prime Directives

Prime Directives have been erased twice, in each of the sequels.

RoboCop 2 sees the deletion of all of the directives; after Dr. Faxx has RoboCop reprogrammed with so many new irrelevant, contradictory, and increasingly bizarre directives that he is nearly incapable of taking action. During upload the list scrolls rapidly, however there are at least 262 - the last seen is "Directive 262: Avoid Orion meetings". Robocop electrocutes himself on an electrical substation to clear his database and delete the directives.

Other depiction

In RoboCop: Prime Directives, Directive Four was not present at all, but a saboteur instituted one which is stated as "Terminate John T. Cable". In RoboCop: The Series, Directive Four was also not present. At the end of Prime Directives, all his directives were erased, but RoboCop stated to his son that he would do "What I do: Serve the public trust, protect the innocent, and uphold the law", noting that he would keep his directives by his own free will, not through the imposition of programming.

In the 2014 film, there is no reference to the Directives, but Murphy, like the drones, is programmed to protect 'red assets' in the form of individuals wearing coded bracelets identifying themselves as assets who must be protected. The result is that he is initially unable to shoot or arrest men who are genuinely threats to him without his cybernetic systems shutting down, requiring his human partner to shoot one man who was about to kill Murphy. However, Murphy is able to override this program at the end, when the OmniCorp CEO threatens to shoot his wife and son while wearing a red bracelet.

=== Technology ===
RoboCop carries guns designed for him and is equipped with enhanced reflexes, speed and strength, visual and auditory capabilities.

RoboCop holstering weapon

- Auto-9 – RoboCop's primary weapon; it is a 9mm handgun with a large barrel extension that fires in three-round bursts. The sidearm is stored in a mechanical holster which opens out of RoboCop's right thigh. The prop for the weapon is a modified Beretta 93R. Though unnamed in the films, The Series referred to the Auto-9 by name and added that the main version of the weapon was modified so that no one but RoboCop could actually fire it. In Prime Directives, it could fire various types of ammunition which RoboCop could select at any given time.
- Cobra Assault Cannon – The Cobra Assault Cannon used in RoboCop could fire explosive rounds equivalent to that of a grenade launcher and is based on the Barrett M82A1 anti-materiel rifle.
- Machine gun/rocket launcher – This weapon made its appearance in RoboCop 3 and was never referenced by name other than being called a "weapon arm" in promotional action figures, and a "gun arm" by the production team. To use it, RoboCop removes his left hand and replaces it with the weapon assembly. It contains a 9 mm Calico M960, a flamethrower and a small missile launcher with a projectile potent enough to destroy an armored vehicle.
- Flightpack/recharging station – A large jetpack that allows RoboCop to fly. It also doubles as a replenishing system for when RoboCop's battery system is low on power. As seen in RoboCop 3, the jetpack allows Murphy to overcome his relatively limited mobility for tactical advantage in combat. Referred to in the film as a "flightpack" and by production as a "jetpack", some Japanese schematics also mention "Gyropack" as a name.
- Mini-gun/cannon – This weapon appears in Frank Miller's RoboCop comic book and was originally meant to be RoboCop's arm cannon prior to the final product in RoboCop 3.
- Data spike – RoboCop's data spike is a sharp, spike-like device that protrudes from Robocop's right fist. This device can be used by Robocop to interface with a corresponding data port in order to download information from the police database and compare information he has gathered from his missions with the police database. Not actually a weapon, this device was also used to kill Clarence Boddicker; having pinned RoboCop under a pile of scrap metal, the cyborg stabbed Boddicker in the throat, killing the crime lord. The spike does not make an appearance in the second, but it is used by RoboCop in the third film to access the OCP mainframe where he finds that a young girl's parents have been eliminated. It also appears regularly throughout RoboCop: The Series, including its use as a self-repair/welding type instrument.
- Explosives – In RoboCop: The Series, unidentified explosive devices were equipped in Robocop's left thigh holster, and adhere to metallic surfaces. When armed, they can be detonated by weapons-fire, and are used primarily to remove barricades and other obstacles.
- Ramset/Rambolt – In RoboCop: The Series, RoboCop came with a Ramset/Rambolt function, wherein he can anchor himself to the spot by deploying a pair of retractable bolts out of the bottom of each foot. When anchored in place, RoboCop is able to stop a colliding car in its tracks. While this function is called 'Ramset' in its first two appearances, in ep. #03 "Officer Missing", & #04 "What Money Can't Buy", in all its following appearances, it is called 'Rambolt'.

=== Perception ===
RoboCop's vision has an internal zoom capability for better aim, as well as tracking. RoboCop also has different vision modes, but the only one that has been used in the movies was thermal vision, as seen in RoboCop and RoboCop 3. His systems use a grid which is crucial to RoboCop's targeting, as well as bullet trajectory (allowing him to make ricochet shots), though apparently the targeting reticle of RoboCop is internal to him, as seen in the first movie. As seen in RoboCop 2, RoboCop's programming prevents him from targeting children, which allowed Hob to shoot RoboCop and escape the Nuke drug lab. He also has a recorder which can detect voice fluctuations and stress, as well as play back audio/visual. This recording capability enables RoboCop to document any situation he encounters with perfect recall and unbiased neutrality, with his memory being deemed through legal agreement as admissible evidence in a court of law. As seen in RoboCop 2, RoboCop possesses a directional microphone with which he can track conversations from a distance. It would seem to be very sensitive, as he can hear vehicles approaching from afar despite being indoors (as he did when he was hiding out in RoboCop 3).

In the television series, he is capable of lie detection by means of a polygraph, via vocalization. He is also capable of perceiving alternate wavelengths of the EM spectrum (i.e. Infrared), allowing him to see invisible things, see in the dark and through solid barriers.

In the reboot film, his vision is greatly enhanced: His visor comes down when in attack mode, and is usually up when in sentry mode. He uploaded the entire database of the Detroit PD in the visor, allowing him to instantly spot criminals in the crowd (as shown during a demonstration, where he spotted a criminal and arrested him). He also has an internal microphone allowing him to speak directly with OmniCorp officials.

=== Body structure ===
Various displays and interpretations range from RoboCop being mostly electronic and mechanical, while others depict his structure as balanced between the two. In the original print of the film, director Verhoeven recorded the death scene, in which crime lord Clarence Boddicker shoots Murphy in the head at point blank range, blowing out the complete rear right side of Murphy's head. This would necessitate the computer running RoboCop, with Murphy's only partial brain interacting with the computer. This scene and successive conflict structure was removed from the original release, though the back head explosion scene and destructive showing of Murphy's head is included in most successive home releases as a deleted scene. In the released theatrical version and original VHS home releases, only the front of Murphy's head and the entry wound are shown (visible when RoboCop removes his helmet in the final act). Alex Murphy's brain, nervous system and personality apparently remain intact; he is able to fully reassert himself after most of the external controlling systems are destroyed and punctuated at the end of the film, where he states his identity as "Murphy" rather than RoboCop.

While all of Murphy's limbs have been replaced with "total body prosthesis" (as indicated with the scene where Murphy's left arm is announced as salvaged) Murphy's nervous system is maintained. The first movie lets the viewer assume that some of Murphy's organs were transplanted into the cyborg (without clearly stating which ones and to which extent), since he needs to feed on a "rudimentary paste that sustains his organic systems". Donald Johnson (played by Felton Perry) comments that RoboCop's paste "tastes like baby food".

RoboCop's reconstructed external structure is protected by an armored shell composed of "titanium laminated with Kevlar" making RoboCop incredibly resilient against both bombs and bullets, as well as extreme impacts such as being hit by cars and falling off skyscrapers. In RoboCop and RoboCop 3 the body armor is gray, and in RoboCop 2 the armor is blue. RoboCop's hands, midsection, and neck armor are black. As demonstrated in RoboCop, the body armor can sustain thousands of armor-piercing rounds before damage begins to appear on the armor. It is also highly resistant to heat, as in RoboCop, he was unaffected after being caught in a gasoline station explosion and in RoboCop 3 when he was briefly set aflame. His visor is made of the same material and a black strip of bulletproof anti-fog glass which protects the cranium apparatus and eyes. The visor also has an undercloth of Kevlar which protects the neck and covers up any wires etc. It should also be noted that the visor conceals most of Alex Murphy's face, and is attached with screws. When the visor is removed, only Murphy's face (which is grafted onto a completely mechanical skull) from the top of the neck up is exposed. When the helmet is removed, the back of his head exposes part of the metal casing and some minor mechanical elements.

In RoboCop 2, RoboCop's right arm contained a display that alerted personnel to his health status. RoboCop's hands also contain actuators strong enough to crush every bone in a human hand (about 400-foot pounds). His right hand also contains a spike (referred to by fans as a "dataspike" and by production as the "terminal strip") which is used to retrieve or display data from any computer bank with a corresponding port. At the end of the first film, the jack is also used as a stabbing weapon against the antagonist Clarence Boddicker. RoboCop is extremely strong, able to lift the front of the average car over his head with one arm or resist the crushing effort of a car crusher, as seen in the TV series (episodes 5 and 21, respectively). He was designed to be able "to penetrate virtually any building," and breaks locks with ease.

In Frank Miller's RoboCop, RoboCop stores his reserve box magazines in his right wrist; this is never shown in the film series. He is seen reloading the Auto-9 in RoboCop 2 with a magazine already in hand at the start of the scene. In the later television series, the holster area of his left thigh is used to store grenades, though on some schematic drawings the same area is used to store an emergency oxygen tank.

RoboCop implies that only Murphy's face and brain was used in the construction of RoboCop, as Morton states that "total body prosthesis" was an agreed-upon parameter. It is unclear in the first two films whether or not RoboCop's human face is merely a replica of Murphy's, as it contains a scar where Boddicker shot him in the head, though he tells Murphy's wife, in RoboCop 2, that "they made this to honor him." After touching it, she says, "it's cold."

In RoboCop 3, Dr. Marie Lazarus, RoboCop's chief technician, stated that Murphy's face was indeed transplanted onto a mechanical skull, and that it is not a replica.

In the 2014 RoboCop reboot, RoboCop is seen in several bodies. While the original film left it unclear exactly how much of Murphy's body is left after his reconstruction, this film clearly confirms that Murphy's remaining organic parts are his head, his heart, his lungs, and his right hand. While his face and brain appear basically intact, one of his eyes has been replaced with a cybernetic implant, and there are various chips in his brain to compensate for the cranial trauma and help him integrate with his cybernetic components. Initially, he is constructed in a silver body very similar to the one seen in the original films. Omnicorp CEO Raymond Sellars later has marketing executive Tom Pope conduct focus group testing on a number of other designs. One such design features a transformation function, in which RoboCop could switch from his usual, bulky shape into a slimmer, more human-like form for off-duty public relations purposes. Though Sellars rejects this concept, he selects the slimmer "public relations" design as RoboCop's permanent design, albeit painted black to make him more marketable. Following Sellars' death and the significant damaging of this body, RoboCop is rebuilt in his original body by Dr. Dennett Norton.

Unlike in the original films, RoboCop's head is contained within a helmet, instead of his face being transplanted onto a metal skull, although it is unclear how much of Murphy's original skeletal structure is still intact. One feature common in every design seen in the reboot film is that the visor, which was screwed onto RoboCop's head in the original films, can move up and down freely, commonly moving over his eyes when his emotions spike and his crimefighting programs activate.

In RoboCop: Creating a Legend, a bonus feature on the RoboCop: 20th Anniversary DVD, it is stated that Murphy's face was removed from his corpse and implanted on the cyborg's head to give RoboCop a sense of identity. This psychological disruption RoboCop may have experienced is explained from the basis that a person whose memory has been erased would still possess the memory of being human and would suffer a psychotic breakdown if he saw the reflection of a robotic image instead of his original image of humanity.

== In other media ==
Since his 1987 film debut, the RoboCop character and franchise have been exercised through numerous entertainment media including multiple television series, comic books, video games, and action figures.

=== Television ===
RoboCop has appeared in numerous television series based on the films. These include:

- RoboCop appears in RoboCop played by Richard Eden. The series takes place four to five years after the original film; Murphy's mother and father were introduced. His father Russell Murphy was a devout police officer himself for many years until his retirement. He is responsible for instilling Murphy with his trademark sense of duty and dedication to law enforcement, even after his transformation into a cyborg. Throughout the series, Murphy finds himself teamed up with his father on a few cases that often saw them utilizing the elder Murphy's expertise in dealing with reappearing criminals he had chased back before his retirement. Although his father was stern, it was clear Murphy's parents loved and cherished him even after his 'demise.' However, at the end of the episode Corporate raiders, Russell Murphy finds out that it is his son under the RoboCop enhancements. Ellen (known as Nancy in the series for apparent copyright reasons) and Jimmy Murphy were recurring characters as well, often finding themselves crossing paths with Murphy by falling in inadvertently or intentionally with the criminal element to which Murphy interfered and protected them from harm. Despite his series partner Madigan's concerns to tell his family who he is, Murphy replied firmly "No" as he felt doing so would hurt them even more. He commented that "they need a husband... and a father. I cannot be that. But I can protect them."
- RoboCop appears in RoboCop: Prime Directives played by Page Fletcher. The series takes place ten years after the first film's events. RoboCop has become outdated, tired, and quasi-suicidal. Delta City (formerly Detroit) is now considered the safest place on Earth, and he is no longer viewed as particularly necessary. The first half of the series focuses on Alex Murphy's former partner John T. Cable who is slain by RoboCop due to his system being hacked and being programmed to terminate Cable. Cable is then resurrected as a cyborg in most aspects identical to the RoboCop model, save for color and the addition of a second sidearm. "RoboCable" is sent to destroy RoboCop. After several battles, Cable is convinced to join Murphy. Meanwhile, OCP (on the verge of bankruptcy) is taken over by a scheming executive Damian Lowe who manages to murder the entire board of directors. To bring OCP back, he plans to use an artificial intelligence called SAINT to automate the entire city. The second half of the series introduces Dr. David Kaydick, who plans to introduce a "bio-tech" virus (Legion) to wipe out not only Delta City but all life on the planet, infecting computers and people alike. He takes control of RoboCable by planting a chip in him that causes him pain or death at Kaydick's discretion. RoboCop receives aid from a group of tech thieves led by Ann R. Key (Leslie Hope), who are determined to stop Kaydick and RoboCop's own son James – now fully grown and aware of his father's fate. RoboCop and his rag-tag band race to stop Kaydick from infiltrating OCP tower and activating SAINT, which would presumably kill almost all humans. During the confrontation, RoboCop and James reconcile with each other, and manage to rekindle RoboCable's previous personality. Ann R. Key and Kaydick both die during a confrontation with each other. Utilizing James's EMP device, and having shut down RoboCop, RoboCable and LEGION are terminated. RoboCop gets rebooted without his previous OCP restriction programming (as well as restoring his identity as "Alex Murphy" as opposed to an OCP product number) or his prime directives. After viewing a goodbye message left by Cable, Murphy returns to active duty to stop the resultant crime in Delta City due to the EMP pulse blacking out the city.
- Based on the original movie, the first RoboCop animated series features cyborg cop Alex Murphy/RoboCop voiced by Robert Bockstael, who fights to save the city of Old Detroit from assorted rogue elements, and on occasion, fights to reclaim aspects of his humanity and maintain his usefulness in the eyes of the "Old Man", Chairman of OCP. Many episodes see RoboCop's reputation put to the test or soured by interventions from Dr. McNamara, the creator of ED-260, the upgradable version of the Enforcement Droid Series 209 and the top competitor for the financial backing of OCP. He continually develops other mechanical menaces that threaten RoboCop. In the police force, RoboCop is befriended as always by Officer Anne Lewis, but is also picked on and lambasted by the prejudiced Lieutenant Roger Hedgecock (who appeared as a minor character in the original film and his first name is revealed in "Night of the Archer"), ever determined to be rid of him and his kind, whom he sees as ticking time bombs. Their rivalry comes to a fever pitch during the episode "The Man in the Iron Suit," in which Hedgecock comes close to finally beating Murphy with the aid of a new weapons system developed by McNamara. He almost kills Lewis when she interferes, enraging Murphy into tearing Hedgecock's iron suit apart and nearly crushing his skull before Lewis emerges, alive and well. RoboCop is maintained by RoboCop Project director Dr. Tyler.
- RoboCop appears in RoboCop: Alpha Commando voiced by David Sobolov. The series is set in the year 2030 and deals with RoboCop being reactivated after five years offline to assist a federal high-tech group "Alpha Division" in their vigilance and struggle against DARC (Directorate for Anarchy, Revenge, and Chaos), a highly advanced terrorist organization and other forces of evil whenever that may be, globally or nationally. The series shared many of the same writers who had contributed to the 1980s animated series, but had even less in common with the movies or television canon that it was based on, including the first animated series. RoboCop now has numerous gadgets in his body that were never in the film such as roller skates and a parachute. The show also suffers from major continuity errors. In the first episodes, the viewers see RoboCop's son in his memories flashback and he appears to be around ten. The viewers later see his son in the series, to be exactly the same age and even wearing the same clothing, as his memories. The absence of Anne Lewis was never explained. Besides RoboCop himself, Sgt. Reed is the only character from the movies in the series. Unlike the movies and previous TV incarnations, RoboCop never takes off his helmet in Alpha Commando.

=== Video games ===
RoboCop has appeared in several video game adaptions for the films, as well as games in which the character crossed over with other properties.

- RoboCop appears in a video game adaption of RoboCop.
- RoboCop later appears in a video game adaption of RoboCop 2.
- RoboCop also appears in a video game adaption of RoboCop 3.
- RoboCop appears as one of the central characters in RoboCop Versus The Terminator.
- RoboCop reappears in a 2003 reboot video game adaption of the original RoboCop film.
- RoboCop is parodied in the shooter game Broforce as a playable character known as Brobocop. His weapon is a blaster that can fire rapid bullets if the attack button is held on for long enough. His special skill is he scans the area for enemies and then depending on how many he finds, he lets loose a barrage of missiles.
- RoboCop had a tie-in video game for Android for the 2014 reboot.
- RoboCop appears as a playable character in the Mortal Kombat 11: Aftermath expansion pack, with Peter Weller reprising his role from the original film and RoboCop 2. In his arcade ending, RoboCop pursued Kano to the latter's universe after discovering that he was supplying Old Detroit's gangs with weapons until he encountered Kronika. After defeating her and becoming the Keeper of Time which changed his appearance and the restrictions of his programming at the same time, RoboCop learned about the full extent of OCP's corruption and led a task force of other Mortal Kombat characters to stop them.
- RoboCop was added as a purchasable outfit in the online battle royale game Fortnite. Additionally, ED-209 appears as an emote.
- RoboCop appears in the 2023 game, RoboCop: Rogue City, and its standalone expansion, Rogue City ‒ Unfinished Business, with Weller reprising his role as the titular character.
- RoboCop is referenced in the 2017 mobile app South Park: Phone Destroyer with the card Enforcer Jimmy. It is a card of the Sci-Fi theme that sees Jimmy Valmer dressed up as RoboCop, and saying some of his quotes though his actual in-game sprite shows him in just simply a helmet and some protection gear. He has an ability where if any enemies get near him, their charge skills will not be boosted.
- RoboCop is added in WWE SuperCard as a limited time event. Additionally its prime directives and ED-209 are added as support cards with its helmet and body armor added as equipment.
- In the Far Cry video game series, a weapon called the "A.J.M. 9" is a homage to RoboCop's Auto 9 sidearm. The acronym is a reference to Alex Murphy's initials.
- RoboCop is set to appear as a playable character in Call of Duty: Black Ops 7, as part of a purchaseable limited-time event pass. The character is given three cosmetic skins, based on his appearances in RoboCop (1987) and RoboCop 2 (1990).

=== Comic books ===
RoboCop has appeared in several different comic books.

- RoboCop appears in the 23-issue Marvel series and two comic book adaptations of the film series (1987–1992).
- He appears in Dark Horse comics book series (1992–1994).
- RoboCop appears in an omake from Battle Angel Alita.
- He later appears in Avatar Press titles, Frank Miller's RoboCop and more (2003–2005).
- He appears in Dynamite Entertainment comic book series (2010–2012).
- He appears in Boom! Studios comic book series (2013–2015, 2018).

=== Crossovers ===
- A four-issue comic book crossover featuring RoboCop and The Terminator was published in 1992 by Dark Horse Comics. A video game loosely based on the comic was released for the Mega Drive / Genesis, Super NES, Game Boy, and Game Gear. It was awarded Bloodiest Game of 1993 by Electronic Gaming Monthly. An adaptation of Robocop Versus The Terminator was planned in 1995 based on Dark Horse's comic but it was later cancelled.
- In WCW's PPV, Capital Combat, RoboCop comes to the aid of Sting against The Four Horsemen.

=== Miscellaneous ===
- In 1996, rookie NHL defenseman Ed Jovanovski of the Florida Panthers was dubbed "JovoCop" by Panther play-by-play announcer Chris Moore, reflecting the youngster's relentless and punishingly physical style of play. 14 years and two teams later, fate doubled down on Moore's marginally "inside" joke, when Jovanovski, having been traded by Colorado to the Phoenix Coyotes, was thereby paired with that team's assistant coach and defensive strategist, ex-NHL defenseman Ulf Samuelsson, whose own, exceedingly penalized playing career had boasted a similarly punishing, albeit demonstrably "dirtier" brand of play, resulting in commentator Don Cherry, during the 1991 NHL playoffs, dubbing him simply—and not at all flatteringly—RoboCop.
- A RoboCop statue will be built in Detroit after fans raised over $50,000 to fund it. In January 2020, the Detroit Free Press reported that the statue was "almost finished."
- The video game Deus Ex: Human Revolution, which is set in the future and features a cyborg who was attacked, then augmented by the megacorporation, has two police officers, one called Alex Murphy, in a police station in Detroit discussing "That 80s movie about the cop that gets shot up", then one of the men turns to the player and says "Hey, I think we were just talking about you."
- In the 1995 film adaptation of The Indian in the Cupboard, main character Omri places amongst different action figures - including Darth Vader - a RoboCop action figure into the cupboard bringing them all to life. RoboCop utters, "Halt!" before being returned to a regular toy after Omri becomes frightened by the venture. RoboCop was played here by J.R. Horsting.
- In an episode of Family Guy, the characters substitute paintball guns for real guns. When one character mentions that getting shot hurts, Peter Griffin tells him to calm down because he is "doing better than Peter Weller in the opening scene of RoboCop". In the episode "Burning Down the Bayit," Peter tries to talk Joe Swanson out of investigating the arson on Goldman Pharmacy by quoting that even RoboCop took a day off. It then shows a cutaway with RoboCop in his robe and slippers as he turns down a call.
- A Death Battle episode took place between RoboCop and the Terminator, with RoboCop emerging as the victor. He was voiced by Xander Mobus.
- He was also pitted against Terminator in an episode of Epic Rap Battles of History and was portrayed by Nice Peter.
- RoboCop appears in Steven Spielberg film Ready Player One. He appears as an OASIS avatar. RoboCop is shown entering the OASIS and later seen during the Battle of Castle of Anorak where he fought the Sixers.
- In early 2019, fast food franchise Kentucky Fried Chicken announced that the latest celebrity to play the Colonel would be RoboCop. A series of commercials were produced with original actor Peter Weller reprising his role.
- In 2021, the character RoboCop appeared in one of a series of advertisements for UK insurance company Direct Line, played by actor and stuntman Derek Mears.
- In America: The Motion Picture, RoboCop was portrayed by Paul Revere as a cyborg-like centaur after merging with his dead horse.
- In Miraculous: Tales of Ladybug & Cat Noir, the akumatized form of Roger Raincomprix named Rogercop is modelled after RoboCop.
- The character RoboCop is referenced in the song "Alex Murphy Rampage" by the Transnistrian avant-garde deathcore band Carabid, from the album Who Pulls the Trigger In the End.

== Reception ==
The character has had a generally positive reception from critics.

== See also ==
- Cyborg / Victor "Vic" Stone
- Robotman (Cliff Steele)
- Metallo / John Corben
- Bucky Barnes (Marvel Cinematic Universe)
- Nebula (Marvel Cinematic Universe)
- Takeshi Hongo and Hayato Ichimonji
- The Borg
- The Daleks
- Davros
- Master Chief
- Luke Skywalker
- Darth Vader
- Darth Maul
- General Grievous
- 8 Man
- Alita
- Motoko Kusanagi
- V (Cyberpunk 2077)
- Rebecca
- Edward Elric
- Franky (One Piece)
- Rudol von Stroheim
- The Major (Hellsing)
- Rick Sanchez
- Neo
- Trinity
- Brixton Lore
- Grace Harper
- Terminator

== Bibliography ==
- Bates, Dan (December 1987a). "On Location With The Cast & Crew of RoboCop". Cinefantastique. Vol. 18, no. 1. Forest Park, Illinois: Fourth Castle Micromedia. pp. 16–25.
- Bates, Dan (December 1987b). "The Making of RoboCop". Cinefantastique. Vol. 18, no. 1. Forest Park, Illinois: Fourth Castle Micromedia. p. 19.
- Niderost, Eric (August 1987). "Robocop Rob". Fangoria. No. 66. Atlanta, Georgia: Fangoria Publishing, LLC. pp. 20–23. Archived from the original on May 21, 2022.
- Niderost, Eric (August 1987c). "Peter Weller Code Name: RoboCop". Starlog. No. 121. United States: Starlog Group, Inc. pp. 45–48.
- Niderost, Eric (September 1987d). "War, Remembrance and RoboCop". Starlog. No. 122. United States: Starlog Group, Inc. pp. 36–39.
- Sammon, Paul M. (November 1987). "Shooting RoboCop". Cinefex. No. 32. United States. ISSN 0198-1056. Archived from the original on March 4, 2022.
- Warren, Bill (October 1987). "RoboCop The Strong Arm Of The Law". Starlog. No. 123. United States: Starlog Group, Inc. pp. 17–20, 72.
