= Lynnette Mettey =

American actress

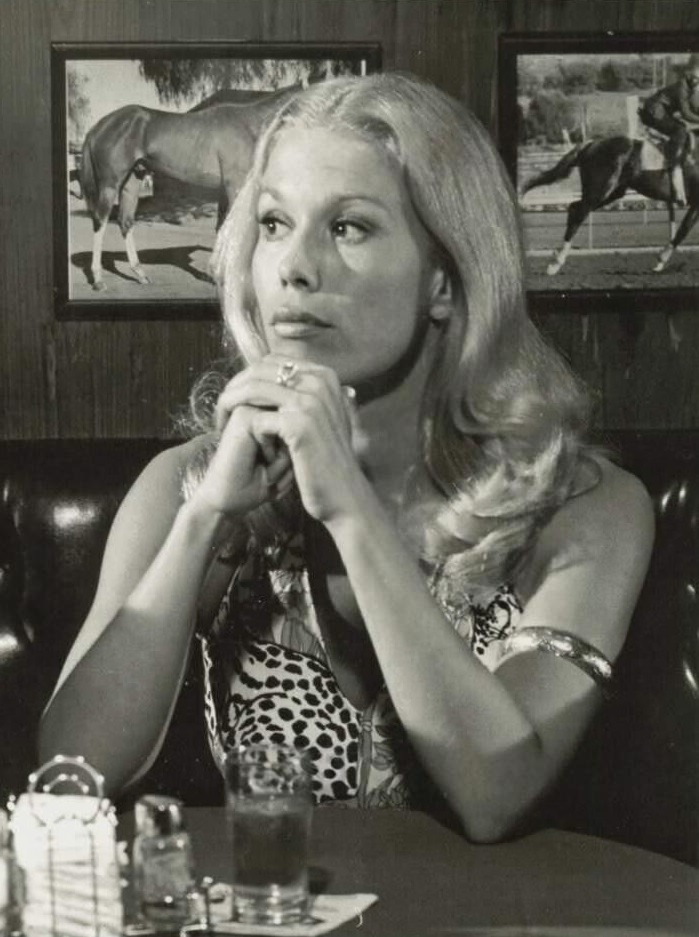
- Mettey in The Rockford Files, 1974
- Occupation: Actress
- Years active: 1970–1996

Lynnette Mettey is an American actress, perhaps best known for her recurring role as Nurse Able on M*A*S*H and as Lee Potter, Quincy's girlfriend, on Quincy, M.E.. She made dozens of guest appearances on television shows during the 1970s and 1980s, including Columbo, All in the Family, Hawaii Five-O, The Six Million Dollar Man, and Simon & Simon.

Mettey also appeared in dozens of television commercials in the 1970s and 1980s, and she has lent her highly recognizable voice to hundreds of radio commercials. For almost 40 years, she was the commercial spokesperson for S. C. Johnson & Son, doing voiceovers for a variety of product advertisements but never appearing on camera.

Throughout her career, she was often credited with an alternate spelling of her first name, as Lynette Mettey.

== Early years ==
Mettey attended Burr and Burton Seminary in Manchester, Vermont and studied dancing at the Joyce Hurley School of Dance. She graduated from the American Academy of Dramatic Arts in New York City in 1962. She is the daughter of Mrs. Madeline Mettey, and she has a sister and a brother.

== Acting career ==
Mettey's early experience on stage included performing with the Caravan Theatre in two 1960 productions at the Dorset Playhouse in Bennington, Vermont. She was a scholarship apprentice with that group in the summer of 1961. A review of her 1965 performance there in The Private Ear and The Public Eye said her "double characterization is charming to watch" and added that her "playing is quiet, warm and assured".

In the summer of 1962 Mettey was the resident ingenue at Deertrees Theatre in Harrison, Maine. Later in 1962 she performed Off-Broadway in The Days and Nights of Beebee Fenstermaker.

Mettey made her television debut in 1970 playing a nurse on an episode of Medical Center. Over the next few years, she made guest appearances on a dozen other shows and appeared in the 1972 television movie Heat of Anger alongside Lee J. Cobb and Susan Hayward.

She appeared in a recurring role as Lt. Nancy Griffin during the first season of M*A*S*H. Mettey portrayed a nurse and love interest of Hawkeye Pierce during the first season. She returned occasionally over the next three seasons to play other characters, portraying Nurse Sheila Anderson, Nurse Baker, and Nurse Able.

Mettey also appeared on the first two seasons of Quincy, M.E., portraying Lee Potter, a girlfriend of the show's title character who sometimes accompanied him on his cases. She played the ex-wife of Dick Smothers' character on the short-lived series Fitz and Bones, reprising that role for the 1982 television movie Terror at Alcatraz.

During the 1990s, she did voice work for a number of animated series including Batman: The Animated Series and Duckman: Private Dick/Family Man

== Personal life ==
Mettey married Michael Pschorr in Manchester, Vermont, on May 16, 1964.

== Filmography ==
Year	Title	Role	Notes
1970	Medical Center	Nurse	1 episode, as Lynette Mettey
1971	Hogan's Heroes	Fraülein Hibbler	1 episode, as Lynette Mettey
1971	Dan August	Joan Oakland	1 episode
1971	Columbo	Gloria Jr.	1 episode
1971	The Doris Day Show	Dolly	1 episode
1971	Ironside	Vera	1 episode, as Lynette Mettey
1971	The F.B.I.	Donna, Marian	2 episodes
1972	Marcus Welby, M.D.	Sue Marshall	1 episode
1972	The Jimmy Stewart Show	Joyce Cone	1 episode
1972	Heat of Anger	Fran	TV Movie, as Lynette Metey
1972	The Bold Ones: The New Doctors	Dee Merlino	1 episode
1972	All in the Family	Susan (uncredited)	1 episode
1973	Love Story	Peggy Gallagher	1 episode, as Lynette Mettey
1973	Kibbee and Fitch	Kate Kibbee	TV Movie, as Lynette Metey
1974	Hawaii Five-O	Cindy Imala	1 episode
1974	Banacek	Emily Parker	1 episode
1974	Death in Space	Kim Clarion	TV Movie, as Lynette Metey
1973–1974	Kojak	Sgt. Doris Holloway, Joannie Garretty	2 episodes
1974	Police Story	Waitress #2	1 episode
1974	The Rockford Files	Carol Thorne	1 episode
1975	Movin' On	Millie	1 episode
1975	Harry O	Barbara Manush	1 episode, as Lynette Mettey
1972–1975	Cannon	Doris Grady, Laura Corey, Waitress	3 episodes
1973–1976	M*A*S*H	Lt. Nancy Griffin, Nurse Sheila Anderson, Nurse Able, Nurse Baker	6 episodes
1976	The Streets of San Francisco	Ellen Matthews	1 episode
1976	Special Delivery	Marj	Movie, as Lynette Mettey
1976	Arthur Hailey's the Moneychangers	Bank clerk	TV Mini Series, 1 episode
1976–77	Quincy, M.E.	Lee Potter	7 episodes
1977	The Six Million Dollar Man	Joan	
1979	Starting Fresh		TV Movie, as Lynette Metey
1979	The Runaways	Barbara Mardsen	2 episodes, as Lynette Mettey
1977–79	Barnaby Jones	Leslie Jessup, Sally Delphine	2 episodes
1981	The Misadventures of Sheriff Lobo	Jessica Wright	1 episode
1981	Fitz and Bones	Lt. Rosie Cochran Lieutenant Rosie Cochran (as Lynette Mettey)	Series regular
1981	The Ordeal of Bill Carney	Nora Rose	TV Movie, as Lynette Metey
1982	Terror at Alcatraz	Lt. Rosie Cochran	TV Movie, as Lynette Metey
1982	Two of Hearts		TV Movie
1984	Silence of the Heart	Marilyn Cruze	TV Movie (uncredited)
1982–1984	Simon & Simon	Police Chief Mary Louise Drinkman, Joan Klein, Mrs. Jean Edmonds	3 episodes
1985	Trapper John, M.D.	Ginnie Crawfield	1 episode
1986	It's Garry Shandling's Show	Dr. Brody	1 episode, as Lynette Mettey
1986–1988	The Magical World of Disney	Priscilla, Ship Computer Voice, Lynn Franklin	3 episodes
1988	Family Man		1 episode
1988	Favorite Son	Elaine Rose	TV Mini Series, 3 episodes
1989	Liberty & Bash	Terry	Series regular, as Lynette Mettey
1993	Batman: The Animated Series	Janet Van Dorn	1 episode, as Lynette Mettey
1996	Duckman: Private Dick/Family Man	(voice role)	1 episode, as Lynette Mettey
