= RoboCop 3 =

1993 film by Fred Dekker

- Theatrical release poster
- Directed by: Fred Dekker
- Screenplay by: Frank Miller; Fred Dekker
- Story by: Frank Miller
- Based on: Characters by: Edward Neumeier; Michael Miner
- Produced by: Patrick Crowley
- Starring: Robert Burke; Nancy Allen; Jill Hennessy; Remy Ryan; John Castle; Rip Torn
- Cinematography: Gary B. Kibbe
- Edited by: Bert Lovitt
- Music by: Basil Poledouris
- Distributed by: Orion Pictures; Columbia Pictures (International)
- Release dates: April 18, 1993 (Japan); November 5, 1993 (United States)
- Running time: 104 minutes
- Country: United States
- Languages: English; Japanese
- Budget: $22 million
- Box office: $47 million

RoboCop 3 is a 1993 American science fiction action film directed by Fred Dekker and written by Dekker and Frank Miller. It is the sequel to the 1990 film RoboCop 2 and the third installment in the RoboCop franchise. It stars Robert Burke, Nancy Allen and Rip Torn. Set in the near future in a dystopian metropolitan Detroit, the plot centers on RoboCop (Burke) as he vows to avenge the death of his partner, Officer Anne Lewis (Allen) and save Detroit from falling into chaos, while evil conglomerate OCP, run by its CEO (Torn), advances its program to demolish the city and build a new "Delta City" over the former homes of the residents.

It was filmed in Atlanta, Georgia. Most of the set and background buildings were slated for demolition to make way for facilities in the 1996 Summer Olympics. RoboCop 3 is the first film to use digital morphing in more than one scene.

The film was a critical and commercial failure in the United States, grossing $47 million worldwide against its $22 million budget, making it the least profitable film of the RoboCop franchise. Two television series, RoboCop and RoboCop: Prime Directives, were released in 1994 and 2001 respectively, and the film series was rebooted with the 2014 remake RoboCop. A video game interquel, RoboCop: Rogue City (set between RoboCop 2 and RoboCop 3), with Peter Weller reprising his role, was released in 2023.

== Plot ==
Following the events of the first two films, the conglomerate Omni Consumer Products (OCP) have succeeded in their plan of acquiring the city of Detroit via bankruptcy but are now struggling. The Kanemitsu Corporation, which bought a controlling stake in OCP following the death of the old chairman, proceeds with his plan of building Delta City. Due to the armed resistance by old Detroit's residents of the construction and demolition, OCP creates a heavily armed private security force called the Urban Rehabilitators, nicknamed "Rehabs", under the command of Paul McDaggett, to force the residents of the now condemned Cadillac Heights out. During one forced relocation, Nikko Halloran, a young resident of Cadillac Heights who is skilled with computers, is separated from her parents, and falls in with The Resistance who use her computer skills to raid OCP facilities.

RoboCop and his partner Anne Lewis try to defend civilians from the Rehabs one night, but McDaggett kills Lewis. Unable to fight back because of his "Fourth Directive" programming RoboCop is saved by Nikko and The Resistance and joins them. Because he was severely damaged during the shoot-out, RoboCop asks the resistance to summon Dr. Marie Lazarus, an OCP engineer that worked on him. Lazarus, disgruntled with OCP, quits and agrees to help. Lazarus reprograms him, deleting the Fourth Directive in the process. During an earlier raid on an armory, The Resistance acquired a jet-pack prototype, originally intended for RoboCop's use, which Lazarus modifies and upgrades for RoboCop to use.

After recovering from his injuries, RoboCop assists The Resistance in their campaign against the Rehabs and OCP. He finds McDaggett and attempts to subdue him. However, McDaggett successfully escapes and obtains information from disgruntled resistance member Coontz about the location of the resistance fighters' base. Kanemitsu dispatches ninja androids called "Otomo" to assist McDaggett against the resistance and RoboCop. Due to Coontz tipping off McDaggett, The Rehabs find, attack, and kill most of The Resistance including its leader, Bertha, while they capture Dr. Lazarus. When RoboCop returns to the destroyed and empty resistance base, an Otomo unit arrives and attacks him. While Otomo severely damages RoboCop by destroying his left arm and auto gun, he manages to destroy the Otomo with his arm-mounted gun. Nikko infiltrates the OCP building and assists a captured Lazarus in broadcasting an improvised video, revealing OCP as responsible for forcibly removing and killing Old Detroit's residents. The broadcast causes OCP's stock to plunge causing financial ruin for the company.

McDaggett decides to execute an all-out strike against Cadillac Heights with the help of the Detroit Police, but the police officers, enraged at OCP following Lazarus's broadcast, instead defect to The Resistance, escalating the rebellion against OCP into a full-scale war. As a result, McDaggett turns to recruiting the Splatterpunk gang to assist with his plans. During the battle between The Resistance, the Police, and McDaggett's forces, RoboCop flies in using his jetpack and destroys the remainder of The Rehabs and McDaggett's men.

He then flies to OCP's headquarters and confronts the waiting McDaggett who arms a small fusion bomb sent by Kanemitsu as a last resort. RoboCop is then attacked and nearly defeated by two Otomo robots. Nikko and Lazarus succeed in reprogramming them using a wireless link from a laptop computer, having them attack each other. The destruction of the robots activates the bomb's countdown, but RoboCop rescues and flees with Nikko and Lazarus. The flaming discharge from the jetpack immobilizes McDaggett, leaving him to perish in the blast.

As Old Detroit is being cleaned up, Kanemitsu arrives and finally comes face to face with RoboCop and his allies, while his translator tells the OCP CEO on Kanemitsu's behalf that he is fired. Kanemitsu then bows to RoboCop and the group in respect. The fired OCP CEO compliments RoboCop and asks for his name, to which he responds, "My friends call me Murphy. You call me RoboCop."

== Cast ==
- Robert Burke as Officer Alex Murphy / RoboCop, a cyborg police officer who aids the resistance
- Nancy Allen as Officer Anne Lewis, RoboCop's heroic partner
- Jill Hennessy as Dr. Marie Lazarus, a virtuous scientist who previously worked on RoboCop
- Remy Ryan as Nikko Halloran, a young girl and computer expert who is a member of the resistance
- Rip Torn as the vicious CEO of OCP who succeeds the "Old Man"
- John Castle as Paul McDaggett, the head of the Rehabs
- Bruce Locke as Ōtomo, a ninja android created by the Kanemitsu Corporation
- Mako as Kanemitsu, the CEO of the Kanemitsu Corporation
- Felton Perry as Donald Johnson, an OCP Vice President
- Robert DoQui as Sergeant Warren Reed
- Bradley Whitford as Jeffrey Fleck, the head of OCP's Security Concept Division
- CCH Pounder as Bertha, a leading member of the resistance who takes Nikko under her protection
- Daniel von Bargen as Moreno, a member of the resistance
- Stanley Anderson as Zack, a member of the resistance
- Stephen Root as Coontz, a member of the resistance
- Mario Machado and Eva LaRue as Casey Wong and Debbie Dix, co-anchors of Mediabreak
- Jodi Long as Keiko Halloran, Nikko’s mother who was killed by the Rehabs
- John Posey as David Halloran, Nikko’s father who was killed by the Rehabs
- Shane Black as Officer Donnelly
- S.D. Nemeth as Bixby Snyder
- Jeff Garlin as Donut Jerk
- Lee Arenberg as a Hold-Up Man

== Production ==
=== Development and writing ===
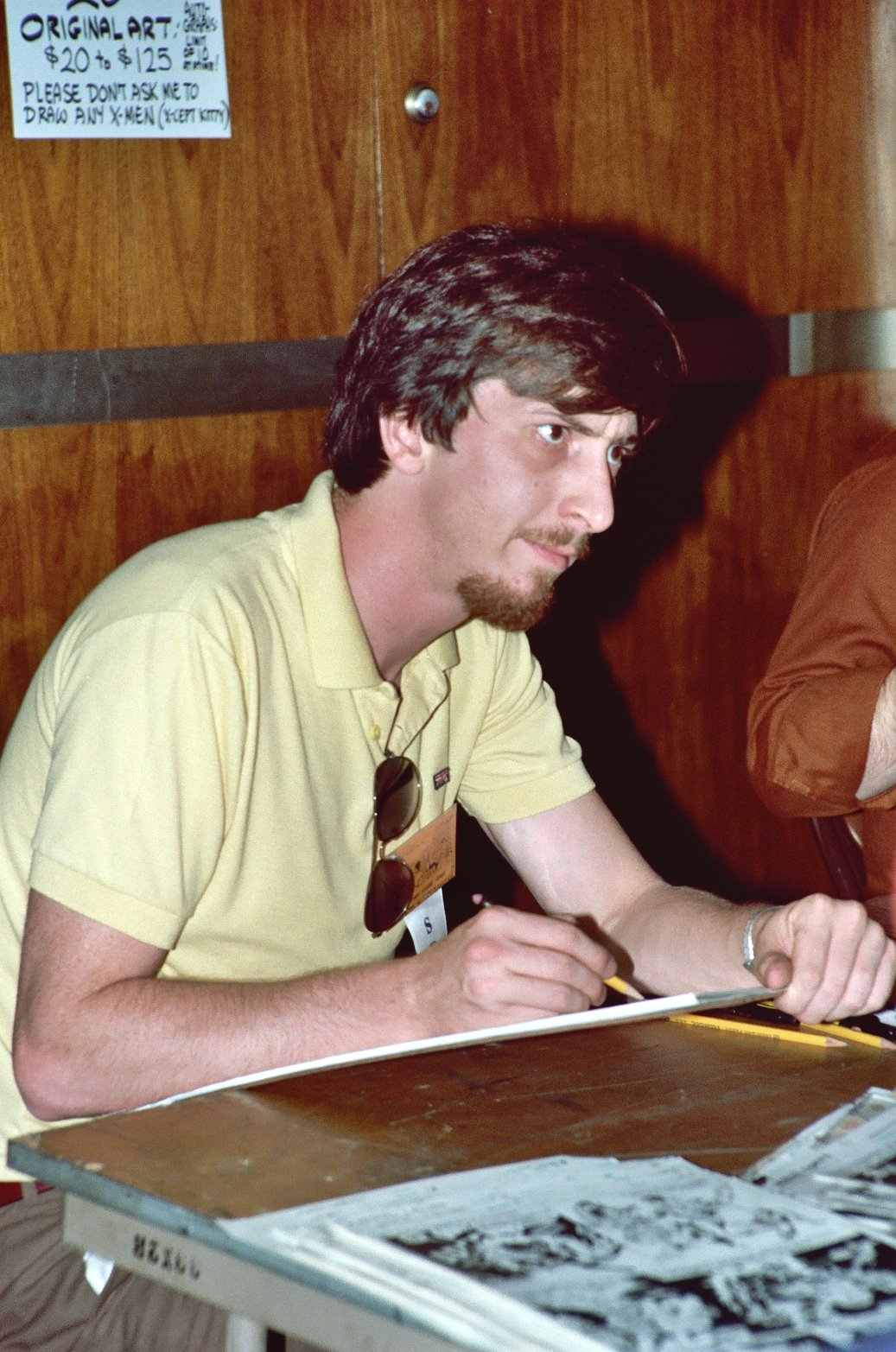
Frank Miller (photographed in 1982)

Orion Pictures greenlighted two more RoboCop films in June 1990, shortly before the release of RoboCop 2. The film was directed by Fred Dekker, a director primarily known for cult horror films like Night of the Creeps and The Monster Squad. Comic author Frank Miller, who co-wrote RoboCop 2, returned to write the screenplay for the film. Still optimistic that he could make an impression in Hollywood, Miller hoped that some of his ideas excised from RoboCop 2 would make it into RoboCop 3. Major themes of the plot were taken from Miller's original and rejected draft of RoboCop 2. Disillusioned after finding that his work was even more drastically altered, Miller left Hollywood, until the 2005 adaptation of his work Sin City. Miller said in 2005, "[Working on RoboCop 2 and 3] I learned the same lesson. Don't be the writer. The director's got the power. The screenplay is a fire hydrant, and there's a row of dogs around the block waiting for it." Miller's original screenplay for RoboCop 2, and source for major ideas in RoboCop 3, was later turned into a nine-part comic book series called Frank Miller's RoboCop. Boom Studios released an eight-part comic book series Robocop: The Last Stand which is based on Miller's original RoboCop 3 screenplay.

=== Casting ===
The star of the previous films, Peter Weller, did not reprise the role of RoboCop, as he was starring in Naked Lunch. The news of Weller's retirement from the role in September 1990 led to rumors that the film would be cancelled, which producer Patrick Crowley quickly denied. Robert John Burke signed to play the cyborg character instead. The RoboCop suit Burke wore in the movie was originally built for RoboCop 2 (1990). Burke often complained that wearing it was painful after a short time.

Recognizing that "some of RoboCop's biggest fans were children", Orion Pictures cut down on the graphic violence that was seen as the defining characteristic of the first two films.

=== Production ===
RoboCop 3 was originally scheduled to begin principal photography on December 3, 1990, but was later postponed until February 4, 1991. Filming took place primarily in Atlanta with shooting at Auburn Avenue, Georgia Avenue Church, Allied Cotton Mills, and Old Alabama Street. The production took 14 weeks and concluded in May 1991.

Initially scheduled for release in mid 1992, RoboCop 3 languished until the following year, as Orion Pictures went through bankruptcy and was bought out. Since Columbia TriStar Entertainment owned the international distribution rights to film, a completed workprint was theatrically released in Japan, South Korea, and the Philippines during that time. After the buyout, Orion Pictures announced that it would finally release the film on July 16, 1993, but had to postpone the release again because it could not find enough distributors for a theatrical wide release. After this delay, pirated copies of the film started getting illegally sold on VHS in New York City in mid 1993. The film finally opened at the Charleston International Film Festival on November 4, 1993. Because of release delays, its tie-in video game was released prior to the film, and thus spoiled the film's plot.

== Music ==
After RoboCop 2's score which was composed by Leonard Rosenman, the original RoboCop composer Basil Poledouris returned to compose the score, and brought back many of the themes from the original film.

== Reception ==
=== Box office ===
RoboCop 3 opened at number one in Japan, grossing 147,695,744 yen ($1.3 million) in its opening week from 17 screens, and went on to gross over $10 million there. It also opened at number one in France, with a gross of 9.6 million French franc ($1.7 million) from 317 screens. In the US, it grossed $4.3 million in its opening weekend from 1,796 theaters, placing third, ending its run with $10.6 million in the United States and Canada. Internationally, it grossed $36.3 million for a worldwide gross of $47 million, against an estimated $22 million production budget.

=== Critical response ===
On the review aggregator website Rotten Tomatoes, 18% of 102 critics' reviews are positive. The website's consensus reads: "This asinine sequel should be placed under arrest." Metacritic, which uses a weighted average, assigned the film a score of 40 out of 100, based on 15 critics, indicating "mixed or average" reviews.

Richard Harrington from The Washington Post said the movie is "hardly riveting and often it's downright silly. The sets and effects betray their downsized budget."

Chicago Sun Times critic Roger Ebert gave the film one and a half stars, disputing the characters' longevity. "Why do they persist in making these retreads? Because RoboCop is a brand name, I guess, and this is this year's new model. It's an old tradition in Detroit to take an old design and slap on some fresh chrome." To Ebert's amusement, Gene Siskel's thumbs-down review on their TV show suggested that producers should consider making a movie with an evil RoboCop, or even a movie where RoboCop was female.

David Nusair from Reel Film Reviews gave the film two and a half stars, stating: "The best one could hope for is a movie that's not an ordeal to sit through, and on that level, RoboCop 3 certainly excels. When placed side-by-side with the original, the film doesn't quite hold up. But, at the very least, RoboCop 3 works as a popcorn movie—something part two couldn't even manage."

Other points of criticism in this movie include curtailing the graphic violence of the first two films (deliberately done in order to be more family-friendly), less dark humor, the death of Officer Anne Lewis and the absence of Peter Weller in the title role.

== Video game ==
A video game based on the film of same name was released.
