= David Sobolov =

Canadian voice actor (born 1964)

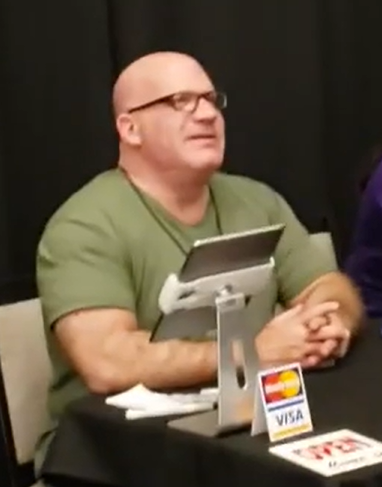
- Sobolov at TFcon 2019
- Born: October 23, 1964 (age 61); Windsor, Ontario, Canada
- Occupations: Voice actor; director
- Years active: 1994–present
- Website: sobolov.com

David Sobolov (born October 23, 1964) is a Canadian voice actor and director, best known for his roles as Gorilla Grodd in various DC media, Drax the Destroyer in various Marvel media, Kaido in One Piece, and various characters in the Transformers franchise; notably Depth Charge in Beast Wars: Transformers, Shockwave in Transformers: Prime, Blitzwing in Bumblebee and Battletrap and Apelinq in Transformers: Rise of the Beasts. Sobolov was born in Windsor, Ontario.

== Filmography ==
=== Animation ===
Year	Title	Role	Notes
1994–1996	Hurricanes	Phantom	
1997	Mummies Alive!	The Eye of Darkness	
1997	The Wacky World of Tex Avery	T-Rex	
1997	Extreme Dinosaurs	Count Alexander Von Skullheim, additional voices	
1998–1999	RoboCop: Alpha Commando	RoboCop	
1998–1999	Beast Wars: Transformers	Depth Charge	
1999	Sabrina: The Animated Series	Spookie Jar	
1999–2001	Spider-Man Unlimited	Lord Tyger	
2003	Teen Titans	Cron	Episode: "Sisters"
2007	Legion of Super Heroes	Persuader	
2012; 2019	Young Justice	Lobo	2 episodes
2012–2013	Transformers: Prime	Shockwave, Vehicon Trooper #1	
2012–2013	Kaijudo: Rise of the Duel Masters	Tatsurion the Unchained, Gate Guardian, Bronze Arm Tribe Spectator	
2013	Regular Show	Dale	Episode: "Power Tower"
2013–2014	Ultimate Spider-Man	Drax the Destroyer, Chitauri	
2014	Avengers Assemble	Drax the Destroyer	Episode: "Guardians and Space Knights"
2014	Hulk and the Agents of S.M.A.S.H.	Drax the Destroyer	
2015–2019	Guardians of the Galaxy	Drax the Destroyer, Blackjack O'Hare, additional voices	
2016–2017	Ben 10	Upgrade, Vin Ethanol, additional voices	
2017	Justice League Action	Gorilla Grodd	

=== Anime ===
Year	Title	Role	Notes
2021–present	One Piece	Kaido	
2021	Super Crooks	Man Mountain, Molecule Master	

=== Anime films ===
Year	Title	Role	Notes
2016	Kingsglaive: Final Fantasy XV	Radio Voice	

=== Film ===
Year	Title	Role	Notes
2000	Monster Mash	Frank	English dub, direct-to-video
2005	Serenity	Reavers	Voice, uncredited
2008	Dragonlance: Dragons of Autumn Twilight	Verminaard	Direct-to-video
2013	Star Trek Into Darkness	Additional voices	
2018	Bumblebee	Blitzwing	Voice
2019	Alita: Battle Angel	Centurion	Voice
2023	Transformers: Rise of the Beasts	Apelinq, Battletrap, Rhinox (uncredited)	Voice

=== Television ===
Year	Title	Role	Notes
2005	Star Trek: Enterprise	Slar	Voice, episode: "In a Mirror, Darkly"
2014–2015	Mighty Med	Annihilator	Recurring voice role
2015	Daredevil	Stone	Voice, uncredited; episode: "Stick"
2015–2023	The Flash	Gorilla Grodd	Recurring voice role
2017–2018	DC's Legends of Tomorrow	Gorilla Grodd	Voice, 2 episodes

=== Video games ===
Year	Title	Role	Notes
2000	Sabrina: The Animated Series: Magical Adventure	Spooky Jar	
2003	Call of Duty	German Loudspeaker, additional voices	
2003	Spawn: Armageddon	Malebolgia	
2004	Shark Tale	Hammerhead Boss, Sawfish Waiter	
2005	Predator: Concrete Jungle	Hunter Borgia	
2005	Rogue Galaxy	Deego Aegis	
2006	Justice League Heroes	Darkseid	
2006	Marvel: Ultimate Alliance	Blackheart, Titannus	
2007	Transformers: The Game	Brawl	
2007	Call of Duty 4: Modern Warfare	Lt. Vasquez	
2009	Halo Wars	Arbiter, additional voices	
2009	Brütal Legend	Pit Boss, Treeback, Bouncers, Druids	
2011	Uncharted 3: Drake's Deception	Marlowe's Agents	
2012	Starhawk	Rifters, Outcast, Radio Control Operators	
2012	Diablo III	Azmodan	
2013	Dota 2	Terrorblade	
2013	Skylanders: Swap Force	Bumble Blast	
2013	Armored Core: Verdict Day	Commander Reaper J, CPU Voice	Credited as David Sobolv
2013	Lego Marvel Super Heroes	Drax the Destroyer, Electro	
2016	Marvel Avengers Academy	Drax the Destroyer, Carnage	
2016	Call of Duty: Modern Warfare Remastered	Lt. Vasquez (archived audio)	
2017	Conan Exiles	Arcos the Wanderer, Warmaker, Additional Voices	
2017	Injustice 2	Doctor Fate	
2018	Conan Exiles	Arcos the Wanderer, Warmaker Klael	
2018	Lego DC Super-Villains	Gorilla Grodd, Lobo, Doctor Fate, Frankenstein, Treasure Hunter	
2018	Fortnite	Black Knight Garridan	
2025	Date Everything!	Washford	
