= F/X: The Series =

- Genre: Action thriller
- Based on: F/X by Gregory Fleeman and Robert T. Megginson
- Starring: Cameron Daddo; Christina Cox; Kevin Dobson; Jacqueline Torres (season 2); Jason Blicker; Carrie-Anne Moss (recurring)
- Theme music composer: Christophe Beck
- Opening theme: Christophe Beck
- Ending theme: Christophe Beck
- Composers: Christophe Beck; Adam Berry (additional music); Mark Kilian (additional music); Eric Colvin (additional music); Kevin Manthei (additional music)
- Country of origin: Canada
- No. of seasons: 2
- No. of episodes: 40

Production
- Producers: Stephen Downing; Jay Firestone
- Running time: 1 hour
- Production companies: Rysher Entertainment; Fireworks Entertainment Inc.

Original release
- Network: CTV
- Release: September 9, 1996 – May 25, 1998

F/X: The Series is a Canadian television series based on the film F/X, starring Cameron Daddo, Christina Cox, Kevin Dobson (season 1), Jacqueline Torres (season 2), Carrie-Anne Moss and Jason Blicker. It ran for 40 episodes on CTV from September 9, 1996 through May 25, 1998.

Much or all of the show was filmed in Toronto, Ontario, Canada (save for stock footage to make it appear to be New York City). The opening sequence ended with a television crew in the foreground loading trucks, and an enormous advertisement (painted on the rear of a building) for The Phantom of the Opera, of which a theatrical production was showing in Toronto at the time.

== Premise ==
The show focuses on Rollie Tyler (Cameron Daddo), a special effects man in NYC, who assists NYPD detective Leo McCarthy (Kevin Dobson) in capturing criminals. In the second season, Dobson's character was killed and replaced with Mira Sanchez (Jacqueline Torres).

== Cast ==
- Cameron Daddo as Rollie Tyler, a special effects expert who moonlights as a forensic investigator and expert for the NYPD.
- Kevin Dobson as Detective Leo McCarthy (season 1), a veteran NYPD officer and Tyler's handler until his untimely murder.
- Christina Cox as Angie Ramirez, Tyler's Puerto Rican friend and co-worker.
- Jason Blicker as Detective Francis Gatti, McCarthy's partner.
- Richard Waugh as Captain Marvin Van Duren, the NYPD commander overseeing all of Tyler's cases.
- Carrie-Anne Moss as Lucinda "Luce" Scott (season 1), a struggling actress brought in by Tyler to act as a ringer or body double when needed.
- Jacqueline Torres as Mira Sanchez (season 2), the NYPD officer who replaces McCarthy as Tyler's police handler.
- Sherry Miller as Colleen O'Malley (season 1)

== Episodes ==
=== Season 1 (1996–97) ===
No. overall	No. in season	Title	Directed by	Written by	Original release date
1	1	"The Illusion"	Paul Lynch	John Fasano	September 9, 1996
2	2	"The Illusion"	Paul Lynch	John Fasano	September 9, 1996
3	3	"Zero Hour"	Eric Till	Mary Crawford & Alan Templeton	September 16, 1996
4	4	"High Risk"	Mike Vejar	William Gray	September 23, 1996
5	5	"Payback"	Mike Vejar	William Gray	September 30, 1996
6	6	"The Ring"	Mike Vejar	William Gray	October 7, 1996
7	7	"Dingo"	Allan Eastman	William Gray	October 14, 1996
8	8	"White Light"	Mario Azzopardi	Mary Crawford & Alan Templeton	October 21, 1996
9	9	"The Brotherhood"	Jim Charleston	John Sheppard	October 28, 1996
10	10	"French Kiss"	Allan Eastman	Robert Hopkins	November 4, 1996
A close friend of Tyler's is accidentally killed by a bomb meant for Diane Nealey, an investment banker and money launderer who stole millions of dollars from Cuban mob boss Ernesto Arias. McCarthy enlists Tyler and Angie to help him find Nealey after determining that she faked her death with help from Ernesto's top enforcer, Roberto. However, when Roberto realizes that the cops are onto him, he murders Nealey to cover his tracks. Tyler then uses prosthetics to transform actress Lucinda Scott into the spitting image of Nealey and has her trick the gang into bringing her to their hideout with a tracker. Roberto sees through Lucinda's disguise and leaves another bomb to kill her. Angie and McCarthy subdue Robert's men while Lucinda helps Tyler retrieve the bomb and detonate it under Roberto's van, killing him while still leaving enough evidence to build a case against Arias.
11	11	"Eye of the Dragon"	Mike Vejar	Robert Hopkins	November 11, 1996
12	12	"Target"	Mike Vejar	Mary Crawford & Alan Templeton	November 18, 1996
13	13	"Supernote"	Steve DiMarco	John Considine	November 25, 1996
14	14	"Medea"	Jon Cassar	Alison Lea Bingeman	January 20, 1997
15	15	"Shivaree"	Mike Vejar	Mary Crawford & Alan Templeton	January 27, 1997
16	16	"Gemini"	Paul Lynch	John Sheppard	February 3, 1997
17	17	"Double Image"	Paul Lynch	Robert Hopkins	February 10, 1997
18	18	"Quicksilver"	Mike Vejar	Alison Lea Bingeman	February 17, 1997
19	19	"Get Fast"	Allan Eastman	Mary Crawford & Alan Templeton	April 21, 1997
20	20	"Bad Influence"	J. Miles Dale	John Sheppard	April 28, 1997
21	21	"Reunion"	Paul Lynch	William Gray	May 5, 1997
22	22	"Script Doctor"	Steve DiMarco	John Fasano	May 12, 1997

=== Season 2 (1997–98) ===
No. overall	No. in season	Title	Directed by	Written by	Original release date
23	1	"Requiem for a Cop"	Paul Lynch	Stephen Downing	September 15, 1997
24	2	"Unfinished Business"	Paul Lynch	Edward Allen Bernero	September 22, 1997
25	3	"Siege"	Doug Lefler	William Gray	September 29, 1997
26	4	"Shooting Mickey"	William Gereghty	Mary Crawford & Alan Templeton	October 6, 1997
27	5	"Deep Cover"	Stephen Posey	Mary Crawford & Alan Templeton	October 13, 1997
28	6	"House of Horrors"	Mario Azzopardi	Avrum Jacobson	October 20, 1997
29	7	"High Roller"	James Head	Mary Crawford & Alan Templeton	October 27, 1997
30	8	"Ritual"	Doug Lefler	Story by : Damian Kindler; Teleplay by : Damian Kindler & Mary Crawford & Alan Templeton	November 3, 1997
31	9	"Spanish Harlem"	Paul Lynch	Robert Hopkins	November 10, 1997
32	10	"Flashback"	Paul Lynch	Doug Molitor	November 17, 1997
33	11	"Standoff"	Brad Turner	William Gray	February 2, 1998
Det. Ramirez leaves an informant, Jennifer Elliot, under Tyler's supervision until she can be placed in protective custody, as Ramirez is trying to build a case against Bobby, the right-hand man of biker gang boss Earl Sarason. Bobby obtains pictures of Jennifer onset at one of Tyler's films. Tyler alerts Ramirez and uses prothestic makeup to have Angie and Jennifer switch places; the ruse works long enough for him to get Jennifer to a secure location before the gang catches up. Deanna, Bobby's girlfriend (and the real informant), intervenes and reveals Bobby's plan to usurp Earl. Tyler uses his equipment to set various traps, holding off the bikers, but Bobby soon has a gun pointed at Jennifer. Earl arrives and kicks Bobby out of the gang, agreeing to let Ramirez take him into custody. Jennifer and Deanna embrace, now both free of the gang's clutches.
34	12	"Vigilantes"	Brenton Spencer	Edward Allen Bernero	February 9, 1998
35	13	"Reaper"	Neill Fearnley	Mary Crawford & Alan Templeton	February 16, 1998
36	14	"Inferno"	Mike Vejar	Jim Henshaw	February 23, 1998
37	15	"Evil Eye"	James Head	J. Larry Carroll & David Bennett Carren	May 4, 1998
38	16	"Chiller"	Neill Fearnley	Alex Boon	May 11, 1998
39	17	"Thief"	Mike Vejar	Robert Hopkins	May 18, 1998
40	18	"Red Storm"	J. Miles Dale	Mary Crawford & Alan Templeton	May 25, 1998

== DVD releases ==
Alliance Home Entertainment has released the entire series on DVD in Region 1 (Canada only).

In Region 2, Cinema Club released the first season on DVD in the UK on March 27, 2006.

DVD name	Ep#	Region 1 (CAN)	Region 2 (UK)
Season 1	22	September 28, 2010	March 27, 2006
Season 2	18	October 26, 2010	TBA
