= Cheryl Paris =

American television and film actress (born 1959)

- Born: Cheryl Annie Paris; 1959 (age 66–67); Burley, Idaho, U.S.
- Occupations: Model; Actress
- Years active: 1979–92
- Spouses: Jim Porter (m. 1980; div. 1986) Ken Kercheval (m. 1994; div. 2004)
- Children: 2

Cheryl Annie Paris (born 1959) is an American television and film actress and former fashion model.

== Career ==
In 1979, Paris worked as an Elite Agency model, and during that time she posed for fashion layouts found in both Vogue and Mademoiselle magazines. While attending college for two years in Tampa and Miami, she studied criminal justice.

== Personal life ==
Paris and her five older brothers were raised in California by their mother, who divorced their father around 1963. She spent part of her early childhood in the town of North Highlands, California.

Her first marriage (1980–86) was to Delta Air Lines pilot Jim Porter. They had a daughter, Katherine, together in 1984. Her second marriage (1994–2004) was to the television actor Ken Kercheval. She was Kercheval's third wife. The couple had one child together.

== Filmography ==
Television

Year	Title	Role	Notes
1981	Golden Gate	Claire McCartney	TV movie/pilot
1982	The Renegades	Tracy	TV movie/pilot
1983	T. J. Hooker	Carol Ann Baker	"The Hostages" (season 2, episode 20)
1989	Sweet Bird of Youth	Heavenly Finley	TV movie
1990	Matlock	Sarah McClain	"The Pro" (season 4, episode 19)
1990	Nasty Boys	Jan Palmer	"The Line" (season 1, episode 9)
1990	Good Cops, Bad Cops	Kelly Sherwood	TV movie
1991	Columbo	Marcy Edwards	Columbo and the Murder of a Rock Star (season 10, episode 3)
1992	Dangerous Curves	Courtney Douglas	"Daddy Dearest" (season 2, episode 2)
1992	From the Files of Joseph Wambaugh: A Jury of One	Rita Mulick	TV movie

Film

Year	Title	Role	Notes
1989	Liberty & Bash	Melissa	film debut
1992	Me, Myself and I	Aunt Felicia	
1992	Sweet Justice	Suzanne	
1992	Rescue Me	Hannah	
