= Remy Ryan =

American film and television actress

- Born: Remy Renee Ryan; 1981 or 1982 (age 44–45); Los Angeles, California, U.S.
- Occupations: Film and television actress

Remy Renee Ryan (born 1981/1982) is an American film and television actress. She is best known for playing Nikko Halloran in the 1993 film RoboCop 3.

== Life and career ==
Ryan was born in Los Angeles, California. She began her screen career in 1989, appearing in an episode of the CBS fantasy drama television series Beauty and the Beast, playing Lauren. In 1990, she appeared in the television films Children of the Bride and Fine Things.

Later in her career, Ryan guest-starred in television programs including Northern Exposure, ER, The Practice, The Torkelsons, Mann & Machine, The Shield and American Dreamer. In 1993, she made her film debut, and starred as Nikko Halloran in the film RoboCop 3, starring along with Robert John Burke, Nancy Allen, Jill Hennessy, John Castle and Rip Torn. She also appeared in films such as Monkey Trouble (as Katie Hernandez), Ava's Magical Adventure, The Heart Specialist and Open Window.
