= Fireworks Entertainment =

Canadian-British television and film production company

- Formerly: SkyVision Entertainment (1991–1994); SkyVision Partners (1994–1996); Fireworks Entertainment (1996–2005)
- Industry: Television and film production and distribution
- Founded: 1991; 35 years ago
- Founder: Brian K. Ross
- Defunct: March 14, 2011; 14 years ago
- Fate: Renamed as Content Television
- Successor: Kew Media Group; Quiver Entertainment
- Headquarters: Canada (1991–2005); United Kingdom (2005–2011)
- Key people: Jay Firestone
- Parent: John Labatt Entertainment Group (1991–1996); CanWest (1998–2005); Content Media Corporation PLC (2005–2011)

Fireworks Entertainment (originally Skyvision Entertainment and Skyvision Partners), known simply as Fireworks, was a Canadian-British-American independent film and television studio and production company originally founded in 1991 by Brian K. Ross, and later bought out by Jay Firestone in 1996 to produce, distribute and finance television shows and feature films.

== History ==
Skyvision Entertainment was originally operating as a division of John Labatt Entertainment Group, the parent company of The Sports Network (TSN), then part of the Labatt Brewing Company.

In 1993, Orion Pictures signed an agreement with Skyvision Entertainment to handle series rights to the RoboCop franchise. Also that year, it entered into an agreement with Rigel Entertainment for international distribution rights to RoboCop: The Series. The company, known as Skyvision Partners by then, teamed up with Disney subsidiary Buena Vista Television to produce the first-run syndicated action hour Land's End.

Following Labatt's acquisition by Interbrew in 1995, the renamed NetStar Communications divested Skyvision Entertainment to Jay Firestone, former employee of Alliance Communications, in 1996 and rebranded it to Fireworks Entertainment. The first show under the new name was F/X: The Series, which they acquired from Orion Pictures in 1994.

Fireworks was acquired by Canwest Global in May 1998, and was later sold to ContentFilm (production company of The Cooler), a British company, in April 2005. Over the years, Fireworks amassed a significant catalogue of television shows and movies (under the Fireworks Pictures label). In 2000, Canwest Global had bought out Endemol Entertainment's international distribution arm and its film library and had it placed into Fireworks Entertainment. Also that year, Canwest had acquired the assets of Western International Communications, and its WIC Entertainment unit, along with its library, would later be folded into Fireworks.

In 1998, Peter Hoffman's Seven Arts Pictures formed an alliance with Fireworks to start out the Seven Arts International branding. In 2000, CanWest Films merged with Seven Arts International, another Canwest subsidiary to start the Fireworks Pictures branding to produce theatrical motion pictures. On October 2, 2001, Pliny Porter was hired as head of production and development for the Fireworks Pictures subsidiary, in order to make an effort to continue producing their own feature films. In 2005, after ContentFilm had bought out Fireworks, the television library, through its subsidiary Fireworks Distributing Corp. was sold to rival firm Alliance Atlantis.

On March 14, 2011, Fireworks International was renamed as Content Television and its parent company, ContentFilm was also renamed as Content Media Corporation, which was later acquired by Canadian-based Kew Media Group in 2017 and after Kew Media's liquidation and collapse in 2020, its library was later acquired by Quiver Distribution via its Quiver Entertainment division and in 2023, the underlying rights to the Kew Media library was later acquired by West Side Pictures, with Abacus Media Rights and Magnolia Pictures both handling distribution.

== Court cases ==
The original company was sued by Sony regarding Queen of Swords and by 20th Century Fox regarding Mutant X.

== Television shows (as Fireworks Entertainment) ==
TV shows filmed in widescreen 16:9 from 1998 but generally broadcast in 4:3 pan and scan. The widescreen versions are available on DVD.

- 100 Deeds for Eddie McDowd (co-produced by Nickelodeon)
- 18 Wheels of Justice (co-produced by King World)
- Adventure Inc. (co-produced by Tribune Entertainment)
- Andromeda (Gene Roddenberry; co-produced by Tribune Entertainment)
- Black Hole High
- Caitlin's Way (co-produced by Nickelodeon)
- Even Stevens (co-produced by Disney Channel)
- F/X: The Series (co-produced by Rysher Entertainment)
- Highlander: The Raven (co-produced by Rysher Entertainment)
- La Femme Nikita (co-produced by Warner Bros. Television)
- Land's End (co-produced by Buena Vista Television)
- Mutant X (co-produced by Tribune Entertainment and Marvel Studios)
- Queen of Swords (co-produced by Paramount Television)
- Real Kids, Real Adventures (co-produced by Discovery Kids)
- Relic Hunter (co-produced by Paramount Television)
- RoboCop: The Series (co-produced by Skyvision Entertainment, Rigel Entertainment and Rysher Entertainment)
- RoboCop: Prime Directives (TV miniseries)
- SCTV (distribution only; inherited from WIC during CanWest era)
- Zoe Busiek: Wild Card
- Young Dracula

== Films (as Fireworks Pictures) ==
- A Wrinkle in Time
- An American Rhapsody
- Better Than Sex
- Coronado
- Faithless
- Greenfingers
- Hardball
- Innocence
- Interstate 60
- Me Without You
- Nola
- Passionada
- Raising Victor Vargas
- Rat Race
- Simon Magus
- Solas
- The Believer
- The Man from Elysian Fields
- Who Is Cletis Tout?
