= Thomas Rimmer (actor) =

New Zealand actor

- Born: 6 September 1980 (age 45); Reading, Berkshire, England
- Occupation: Actor

Thomas Rimmer (born 6 September 1980) is a New Zealand stage and screen actor best known for his role in Danny Mulheron's feature film directorial debut Fresh Meat. His television work includes roles in The Gibson Group's Facelift and Bryan Bruce's crime documentary series The Investigator.

In 2011, Thomas also wrote and performed in his solo show Writer's Block.

== Filmography ==
- Fresh Meat (film) (2012)
- Fundamental (2012)
- The Investigator (2011)
- My Living Memory (2011)
- The Insider's Guide To Love (2005)
- Facelift (TV series) (2004)
