= Jay Firestone =

Canadian film and television producer

- Born: October 13, 1956 (age 68); Toronto, Ontario, Canada
- Occupation(s): Film, television producer

Jay Firestone (born 13 October 1956) is a Canadian film and television producer.

== Personal ==
Growing up in a suburb of Toronto, Ontario, Firestone was the third child of six born to Jewish parents Esther, the first female cantor in Canada, and Paul. He attended Hamilton's McMaster University, graduating in 1979 with a degree in commerce and aspirations for accounting and business. After wedding University of Toronto student Sherry Barad and earning his CA a few years later, Firestone joined accounting firm Peat, Marwick, Mitchell and Co.

== Career ==
In 1985, disenchanted with accounting, Firestone helped found Alliance Communications with four of Canada's top producers. Firestone began as chief financial officer and set up a tax-shelter lucrative financing arm. He rose to Vice-Chairman, overseeing world operations. In 1995, he left after falling out with Lantos over company direction. Firestone cashed in his company interests, leaving with film and television credits such as ReBoot, for which he received a Gemini Award for "Best Animation Series.".

Days after his one-year non-compete clause expired, he bought SkyVision Entertainment (the film and television production arm of Labatt Breweries of Canada,) through his newly created company, Fireworks Entertainment, Inc. He attributed the name to his own surname and the exploding film and television industry. He thus acquired 170 program episodes, including reality police series Secret Service, and RoboCop: The Series, based on RoboCop 1987 film.

A year later, Fireworks neared $100 million in production through television series La Femme Nikita, F/X: The Series and Pacific Blue. In Fall 1997, he took Fireworks public, then sold to CanWest Global Communications for over $60 million, making CanWest the sole shareholder and Firestone the chairman and CEO of Canwest Entertainment. He was a finalist for the 1998 Ontario Entrepreneur of the Year.

Firestone was involved in over 20 film and television projects over the next five years. He made films such as Rat Race, Hardball and Rules of Engagement, television shows Relic Hunter, Queen of Swords, Adventure Inc., Mutant X and Andromeda. The independent film The Believer won the Saint George prize for "Best Film" at the 23rd Moscow International Film Festival.

CanWest founder Izzy Asper fell ill and his son Leonard became CEO in time for downsizing, along with the industry. Firestone left the company in May 2003 along with Fireworks Pictures president Daniel Diamond, and was replaced by Gerry Noble, former CEO of Global TV. Firestone honored his one-year non-compete clause.

In April 2005, Canwest Global sold the name and film and television library to ContentFilm, a British company. From 14 March 2011, the name Fireworks became defunct, re-branded Content Television under the umbrella Content Media Corporation PLC.

Firestone next founded Prodigy Pictures. Stuck, a horror film released in 2007, starring Mena Suvari and Stephen Rea, tells the true story of a man hit by a car and left for dead in the driver's garage. A mini-series out of the popular comic book series XIII was released in 2008, starring Stephen Dorff, then a 13-episode follow-up series starred Stuart Townsend. The series aired in France on Canal Plus in 2011 and on Showcase in Canada in spring 2011.

Firestone produced the supernatural series Lost Girl, starring Anna Silk, which broke Showcase's viewing records for Canadian scripted series premiere when it premiered in 2010. Lost Girl ran for five seasons, the final season airing in 2015 in Canada on Showcase. The popular show aired in several countries, including the United States, United Kingdom, Australia, Portugal, and Brazil.

Firestone was a producer on the TV show Dark Matter, which is based on a comic book series created by writers Joseph Mallozzi and Paul Mullie.
