= Richard Eden (actor) =

Canadian actor (born 1956)

- Born: 1956 (age 69–70); Toronto, Ontario, Canada
- Occupation: Actor
- Years active: 1973–present
- Known for: RoboCop in RoboCop: The Series
- Spouse: Shannon Hile (m. 1993)

Richard Eden (born 1956) is a Canadian actor, screenwriter, and producer. He is best known as RoboCop in RoboCop: The Series and has enjoyed a prolific career on stage, television, and in independent films. Eden has received multiple awards and was nominated for a Daytime Emmy in 1987 for his role as Brick Wallace on Santa Barbara.

== Filmography ==
=== Film ===
Year	Title	Role	Notes
1979	Summer's Children	Mechanic #1	
1989	Liberty & Bash	Jesse	
1990	Solar Crisis	Medical tech	
1990	Club Fed	Richard	
1993	Shootfighter: Fight to the Death	Ellison	
1993	Mirror Images 2	Hugh	
1996	Public Enemies	George Barker	
1996	Blossom Time	Pa	
1997	Tear It Down	Matthew	
1997	Just Add Love	Leonard	
1999	Undercover Angel	Fred	
1999	Woman Wanted	Michael	
2005	Callback	Jake	
2009	The Intervention	Tom	
2009	Disappearing in America	Mickey	

=== Television ===
Year	Title	Role	Notes
1971	Trial	Man	Episode: "Witness"
1972	Softly, Softly: Task Force	Det. Con. Rawson	Episode: "Resolution"
1972	Villains	Man	Episode: "George"
1972	Colditz	Pole	Episode: "The Traitor"
1973	Double Identity	Zweiter Sekretär	Episode: "Tote müssen nicht mehr sterben"
1973	Public Eye	Celia's friend	Episode: "The Windsor Royal"
1973	The Rivals of Sherlock Holmes	Officer	Episode: "Cell 13"
1973	Some Mothers Do 'Ave 'Em	Airman in Billet	Episode: "The R.A.F. Reunion"
1983	Emerald Point N.A.S.	Christopher Bailey	8 episodes
1984	Summer Fantasy	Tod	Television film
1984	Lottery!	Frankel	Episode: "Minneapolis: Six Months Down"
1984–1987	Santa Barbara	Brick Wallace	296 episodes
1988	Falcon Crest	Bill	Episode: "Farewell My Lovelies"
1989	Tales from the Crypt	Alien	Episode: "Lover Come Hack to Me"
1989, 1990	Freddy's Nightmares	Roscoe	2 episodes
1990	Max Monroe: Loose Cannon	Bart	Episode: "Felonious Monk"
1991, 1992	Tarzán	Blake Evans	2 episodes
1992	FBI: The Untold Stories	District Attorney	Episode: "Killer Patrol"
1992	Forever Knight	Marty	Episode: "Dying for Fame"
1992	Counterstrike	Bull	Episode: "Death SEAL"
1992	Tropical Heat	Joel Teller	Episode: "The Pro and the Con"
1992	Secret Service	Hartman / Esposito	2 episodes
1993	Silk Stalkings	Monty Banks	Episode: "Star Signs"
1993	Top Cops	George Gundlach	Episode: "John White"
1993	Matrix	Tony Goff	Episode: "Shadows from the Past"
1994	RoboCop	RoboCop	23 episodes
1998	Beyond Belief: Fact or Fiction	Rob Noveau[sic]	Episode: "The Warning"
1999	Total Recall 2070	Cliff	Episode: "Brain Fever"
1999	Killer Deal	York Beal	Television film
1999	Twice in a Lifetime	Mark Smith	Episode: "Double Exposure"
1999	Earth: Final Conflict	Lockhart	Episode: "Emancipation"
1999	The City	Randy	2 episodes
2000	Relic Hunter	Jacob Strom	Episode: "Last of the Mochicas"
2001	Exhibit A: Secrets of Forensic Science	Franck Ryan	Episode: "Bare Bones"
2001	Doc	Alan Seachman	Episode: "You Gotta Have Heart"
2001	Blue Murder	Sgrt. Gerard Kearns	Episode: "Inside Jobs"
2001	The Feast of All Saints	Robert Beauchamp	Television film
2002	Pretend You Don't See Her	Steve Smith	Television film
2002	10,000 Black Men Named George	Fred Bent	Television film
2002	Crossed Over	Joe Magliolo	Television film
2002	Whitewash: The Clarence Brandley Story	Peter Speers	Television film
2002	Adventure Inc.	Charlton Doyle	Episode: "The Fate of the Liverpool Flyer"
