= RoboCop (1994 TV series) =

1994 Canadian TV series

- Genre: Action; Cyberpunk
- Based on: RoboCop by Edward Neumeier & Michael Miner
- Starring: Richard Eden; Yvette Nipar
- Ending theme: "Future to This Life" by Joe Walsh and Lita Ford
- Countries of origin: Canada; United States
- No. of seasons: 1
- No. of episodes: 21 (+ 1 pilot)

Production
- Executive producers: Kevin Gillis; Brian K. Ross; Stephen Downing
- Producers: Jay Firestone; J. Miles Dale
- Production locations: Toronto, Ontario; Mississauga, Ontario
- Running time: 44 minutes
- Production companies: Rysher Entertainment; Skyvision Entertainment; Rigel Entertainment

Original release
- Network: CTV (Canada); Syndication (United States)
- Release: March 14 – November 21, 1994

RoboCop (also known as RoboCop: The Series) is a 1994 cyberpunk television series based on the RoboCop franchise. It stars Richard Eden as the title character. Made to appeal primarily to children and young teenagers, it lacks the graphic violence of the original film RoboCop and its sequel RoboCop 2 and is more in line with the tone of RoboCop 3.

The television series ignores the events of the sequels and many character names are changed from the movie series. The RoboCop character has several non-lethal alternatives to killing criminals, which ensures that certain villains can be recurring. The OCP Chairman and his corporation are treated as simply naïve and ignorant, in contrast to their malicious and immoral behavior from the second film onward.

== Background ==
While RoboCop was initially an American property, Orion Pictures received a $500,000 cash infusion for TV licensing rights by Canada's Skyvision Entertainment in May 1993. Orion Pictures had originally planned to make a fourth RoboCop film, but decided to license a television series instead due to the bankruptcy of the studio and the negative reception to RoboCop 3 (1993). This allowed access to co-production agreements and possible partnerships with other countries. The series was filmed in Toronto and Mississauga, Ontario and originally planned for a January 1994 debut, several months after the unsuccessful release of RoboCop 3. Skyvision was also in negotiation with Peter Weller, the original RoboCop, but this did not come to fruition. 22 episodes were made, but the series was not renewed for a second season. Expense played a significant part in this; according to Skyvision VP Kevin Gillis, episodes would be produced at $1.2 million to $1.5 million each.

The pilot episode runs two hours and was adapted from a discarded RoboCop 2 script, Corporate Wars, by the writers of the original RoboCop, Edward Neumeier and Michael Miner.

Villains on the series include Dr. Cray Z. Mallardo, OCP executive Chip Chayken, William Ray Morgan aka Pudface, Vlad Molotov, who hates being called Stitch.

The series gave writers more of an opportunity to develop the central characters and to extend the human interest aspect through the introduction of Gadget, the station mascot and the adopted, insightful daughter of station Sergeant Parks. Gadget, along with the presence of Jimmy Murphy did much to shift the focus from the adult to the youth target audience. The writers also introduced an element of virtual camaraderie in the character Diana, formerly a secretary to crooked Vice-president Chip Chayken, who is unwillingly turned into the 'mind' of Metronet and OCP's city-running super-computer, NeuroBrain and RoboCop's biggest 'behind-the-scenes' ally in his fight-against-crime.

Many of the characters' names were also altered from their movie counterparts due to rights issues.

== Cast ==
=== Main ===
- Richard Eden as Officer Alex James Murphy / RoboCop. When out on duty, his callsign is "Beta 1".
- Yvette Nipar as Officer / Detective Lisa Madigan, of the Metro South Police Station. She is based on the character Anne Lewis played by Nancy Allen in the film series. When out on duty, Madigan's callsign is "Beta 2". In "Midnight Minus One", Madigan mentions 'coming from money' and that 'it doesn't necessarily do anything good for a family' (her movie counterpart, Anne Lewis, mentions having a brother in Pittsburgh who never bothers to call her).
- Blu Mankuma as Sergeant Stanley Parks, Watch Commander of the Metro South Police Station in Old Detroit. He is based on Sgt. Warren Reed played by Robert DoQui in the film series.
- Andrea Roth as Diana Powers, the clumsy secretary of Chip Chayken at OCP who used her brain for the NeuroBrain project. RoboCop stopped him and Dr. Cray Mallardo from erasing Diana's personality. Diana is now nigh-omniscient/omnipresent throughout Delta City and Old Detroit, along with any computer system that is a part of Metronet/NeuroBrain or else has access to or can hack into. She would often appear as a hologram, sometimes only visible to Robocop.
- David Gardner as OCP Chairman. He cares about Old Detroit and learns a lesson in almost every appearance, bettering his character, but he is ignorant of certain things. He is based on The Old Man played by Dan O'Herlihy in the first two films.
- Sarah Campbell as Gertrude "Gadget" Modesto, an 8/9-year-old girl who was adopted by Sgt. Stanley Parks following the events of the pilot episode, "The Future of Law Enforcement". Later, in episode 17, "Mothers Day", her birth name is revealed as Gertrude Modesto (and that "Gadget" was just the name assigned to her by Family Services); and that at 3 weeks old, she was given up for adoption by her mother, Sally Modesto, who, as a numbers runner for Russian Mafia crimeboss Vlad 'Stitch' Molotov, could not give her daughter the life she wanted to give her. Gadget first became friends with Jimmy Murphy in episode 9, "Provision 22".

=== Recurring cast ===
- Ed Sahely as Charlie Lippencott, RoboCop's technician.
- Dan Duran as Bo Harlan, a newscaster.
- Erica Ehm as Rocky Crenshaw, a newscaster.
- Patrick McKenna as Umberto Ortega, a narcissistic talk show host.
- Jennifer Griffin as Nancy Murphy, wife/widow of the late Alex Murphy.
- Peter Costigan as James Daniel "Jimmy" Murphy, the now-adolescent son of the late Alex Murphy. He first becomes friends with Gadget in episode 9, "Provision 22".
  - Jordan Hughes as Young Jimmy Murphy.
- Martin Milner as Russell Murphy, father of the late Alex Murphy; a retired police captain and chess master. Initially distrusting RoboCop, Russell eventually discovers his son's secret as a cyborg after his death.
- Nonnie Griffin as Dorothy Murphy, mother of the late Alex Murphy; a retired teacher.

=== Villains ===
- James Kidnie as William Ray "Pudface" Morgan; a criminal who blames RoboCop for his disfigurement caused by a toxic accident of Pudface's own making. His character is based on the first Robocop film character Emil Antonowsky, who suffers a similar (but fatal) disfigurement at the end of the film. As the character was not shown to have died in the TV edit of the original movie, his existence can be considered correct for the TV continuity of Robocop. Pudface is repeatedly thwarted by Robocop, and repeatedly requests to not be punched in the face—requests which are always ignored by Robocop.
- Cliff De Young as Dr. Cray Z. Mallardo; a cyberneticist, and a paranoid psychopathic prima donna. In the final episode, "Public Enemies", Mallardo's IQ is measured at a 210 IQ, and his psychological evaluation diagnosis identifies him as a paranoid psychopath.
- John Rubinstein as Chip Chayken, an executive of OCP who co-operated with Mallardo to harvest the brains of homeless people for use in the supercomputer, NeuroBrain.
- Wayne Robson as "Shorty", a trigger man for "Pudface" Morgan.
- Donald Burda as Leo, a trigger man for 'Pudface' Morgan.
- Hrant Alianak as Vlad "Stitch" Molotov, so-called because of the scar on his face (he does not like the nickname "Stitch"). He is the head of the Detroit branch of the Russian Mafia.
- Daniel Kash as Reggie Braga, Brazilian crime boss.
- Barry Flatman as Simon Atwater
- Chris Wiggins as Dr. Roger Yung

=== Others ===
- Roddy Piper as "Tex" Jones, formally "clean-living ... mild-mannered audio-visual research scientist ... with a flair for art" working for Mili-Tech Concepts (part of OCP), before his near-death, disfigurement and addlement at the hands of Simon Atwater. At the same time of the attempt on his life, Jones had just invented the Phase-Pulse Image-Projector, allowing for secret messages to be passed for intelligence-gathering. Jones is also the original creator of "Commander Cash", before Atwater stole the concept (and Jones' other idea, the Phase-Pulse Image-Projector, trying to kill Jones in the process. Appears only in the episode "Robocop vs. Commander Cash", during which Jones mostly poses as Commander Cash in an attempt to foil Atwater for stealing his creations and using them for his plan to drug/mind-control children, en-masse. Jones teams with RoboCop to stop this.

== Episodes ==
No.	Title	Directed by	Written by	Original release date
1	"The Future of Law Enforcement"	Paul Lynch	Michael Miner & Edward Neumeier	14 March 1994
2	"The Future of Law Enforcement"	Paul Lynch	Michael Miner & Edward Neumeier	14 March 1994
RoboCop and Madigan uncover a conspiracy by an insane genius and an OCP executive to develop a computer linked to a human brain designed to run the entire city.
3	"Prime Suspect" "First Suspect"	Paul Shapiro	Lincoln Kibbee	21 March 1994
When televangelist Reverend Bob Taker is killed and the murder weapon is RoboCop's gun, he is arrested and placed on trial. He has an alibi which he refuses to divulge, so he's about to be deactivated.
4	"Trouble in Delta City" "Delta City"	Paul Lynch	William Gray	28 March 1994
A new miracle drug gets rushed to the market by OCP, but more thorough testing reveals that it has powerful mind-altering properties. This causes many people in Delta City to have violent and psychotic outbursts, including none other than officer Madigan. RoboCop investigates to discover the truth about the dangerous drug and to get it off the streets, as well as clear Madigan of any wrongdoing.
5	"Officer Missing" "Absence of Police"	Paul Lynch	Robert Hopkins	4 April 1994
Feeling like the Chairman has been enjoying the spoils of OCP for too long, RoboCop decides to take him on a tour of the rundown part of Old Detroit. There he witnesses first hand the chaos and destruction left in the wake of big business. To make matters worse, a bizarre band of pirates has been terrorizing the streets, and RoboCop gets attacked by them and starts malfunctioning. In order to escape this nightmare, the two must team up with the parents of a sick child who needs a lung transplant.
6	"What Money Can't Buy"	Michael Vejar	Aubrey Solomon	11 April 1994
A sickly boy who was rescued from the slums of Old Detroit desperately needs a lung transplant to stay alive. At the eleventh hour, his donor lungs are stolen by thieves who harvest organs and sell them on the black market for top dollar. It's up to RoboCop to shut down this illegal organ trafficking operation and recover the boy's donor organs in time to save his life.
7	"Ghosts of War"	Alan J. Levi	John Sheppard	18 April 1994
A band of mercenaries begins terrorizing Delta City, and RoboCop must put a stop to them before they carry out a terrorist attack. However, this is no ordinary band of thugs, as the members of this particular group fancy their own identities after their own childhood superheroes. This is done to cover the shame of the physical and psychological scars of war left upon the group, after being disavowed by the military in the aftermath of a rather shady covert operation. RoboCop takes particular interest in this group, as he identifies one of the members as a close childhood friend of his.
8	"Zone Five"	Timothy Bond	Blazes Boylan & Ted Harris	25 April 1994
OCP appoints a vigilante group as new neighborhood watch team in order to solve an ongoing drug problem. They are too hasty in their decision, as it becomes clear that they are actually the drug pushers, and using the watch group as a cover for their operation. RoboCop feels he must step in and expose the operation, especially when he finds his son has been recruited by the group.
9	"Provision 22"	Alan J. Levi	Robert Gilmer	6 May 1994
RoboCop is shocked when he learns his estranged wife and son are living on welfare. The two are also involved in a heated ongoing protest campaign against "Provision 22" which is a law that prevents welfare recipients from working. RoboCop steps in once his wife is arrested, as protesters of the law are subject to brainwashing once detained. After some investigation, RoboCop discovers that behind the legislation is a scandal to keep the middle class oppressed and make the fat cats at OCP more money. Not only must he expose this operation, but he also must prevent a terrorist bombing at a protest rally.
10	"Faces of Eve"	Paul Lynch	John Considine	9 May 1994
A new miracle product from OCP offers consumers new identities via gene transplant therapy. Things go wrong quickly when Pudface Morgan and his gang become aware of this product, and use it to spring out of prison and commit a murder. Things get even worse when Pudface plans to plunge Delta City into chaos by using the Chairman's identity to sabotage OCP and the police department. RoboCop must put a stop to their evil plans, and becomes especially concerned when it becomes public knowledge that his son eyewitnessed the murder.
11	"When Justice Fails"	Michael Vejar	Simon Muntner	16 May 1994
RoboCop and Officer Madigan race to save the lives of four astronauts as they go head-to-head against a flamboyant corporate raider who values profits more than safety.
12	"The Human Factor"	Mario Azzopardi	John Considine	27 May 1994
RoboCop teams-up with his unsuspecting father, a retired police captain, to stop an insane bomber from unleashing a campaign of terror against OCP that could end in nuclear Armageddon.
13	"Inside Crime"	Michael Vejar	William Gray	1 July 1994
The hideous face of Pudface Morgan pulls in boffo ratings for OCP's new hit "reality" tv show which follows the exploits of criminals, but the disfigured maniac has plans to take on RoboCop live on prime time television.
14	"RoboCop vs Commander Cash"	Allan Eastman	Pamela Hickey & Dennys McCoy	4 July 1994
Children are rioting and stealing all over the city as RoboCop faces his most formidable opponent, a nutcase who believes he's a real live version of OCP's super hero, Commander Cash. Note: This was the only episode to be given the G rating on the TVNZ 2. All the other episodes of the series were rated PGR.
15	"Illusions"	Timothy Bond	Robert Hopkins	15 July 1994
RoboCop guards The Chairman of OCP against a mysterious assassin, while Madigan falls under the romantic spell of a handsome young magician who may be the killer.
16	"The Tin Man"	Allan Eastman	Pamela Hickey & Dennys McCoy	22 July 1994
As armed Ice Cream trucks and Lunch Catering vans wage a gang war for control of illegal gambling and Gadget falls victim to Lotto-fever, the past haunts RoboCop when an ex-partner returns as a gang-busting vigilante.
17	"Sisters in Crime"	Mario Azzopardi	Diane K. Shah	29 July 1994
When his sexist views anger feminists, The OCP Chairman is kidnapped by a band of shapely rebels and forced to do housework, while Chip Chayken and his sexy partner plan to rip-off OCP.
18	"Heartbreakers"	Michael Vejar	Alison Lea Bingeman	5 August 1994
It's love at first "byte" when Lippencott enters Virtual Reality and falls for Diana Powers, while RoboCop is blackmailed by the kidnapper of his wife Nancy into stealing a top secret weapon that can literally break hearts.
19	"Mother's Day"	Allan Eastman	John Sheppard	12 September 1994
Gadget's caught in a custody fight and leaves Sergeant Parks to be reunited with her real mother. RoboCop suspects the woman is part of a plot by Russian crime boss Vlad "Stitch" Molotov and his sexy moll, Nadia.
20	"Nano"	William Gereghty	Mary Crawford & Alan Templeton	19 September 1994
While arresting a thief, who is suddenly run down by a runaway bus, Detective Madigan is seriously injured and paralyzed. RoboCop investigates and uncovers a criminal using nanobots to override machinery and electronics.
21	"Corporate Raiders"	T.J. Scott	Pamela Hickey & Dennys McCoy	7 November 1994
The city is being rocked by anti-corporate violence as RoboCop and Officer Madigan are assigned to bring in a charming ex-terrorist, but a corrupt union leader and his sultry secretary have other plans.
22	"Midnight Minus One"	J. Miles Dale	Mary Crawford & Alan Templeton	14 November 1994
RoboCop and Officer Madigan race the clock to prove a killer is innocent before he's executed in front of millions of viewers on a hit television show.
23	"Public Enemies"	Michael Vejar	William Gray	21 November 1994
RoboCop must save the President and First Gentleman from an assassination plot hatched by Dr. Mallardo, Chip Chayken, and Pudface Morgan.

== Soundtrack ==
A soundtrack album entitled A Future to This Life: Robocop – The Series Soundtrack was released on January 24, 1995, on both CD and cassette by Pyramid Records. Aside from the show's theme writers, Joe Walsh & Lita Ford, it features classic rock songs from groups like The Band, The Flamingos, Iron Butterfly, and KC & the Sunshine Band.

== Home media ==
The first five episodes were released on VHS in 1995. Episodes of the series were also released in a Japanese laserdisc set. They include "First Suspect," "Delta City," and "Absence of Police." In Germany and Italy, "The Future Of Law Enforcement" was released as a stand-alone film on V.H.S. and D.V.D., under the name RoboCop 4: Law & Order.

In 2021, Rallie LLC, an affiliate company of co-production partner Rigel Entertainment, acquired the rights to the show from Robocop IP holder MGM. Coinciding with this sale, Rallie remastered all 21 episodes plus the show's two hour pilot and inked deals with streaming service Tubi, as well as home media company Liberation Hall, to release these remasters on to streaming and DVD & Blu-ray respectively.

Release name	No. of discs	Region 1 (Alliance Home Entertainment)	Region 2 (Contender Home Entertainment, Rubber Duck Entertainment)	Region 4 (Madman Entertainment)	Notes
RoboCop the Complete Series	6	27 July 2010 (Canada only)	20 March 2006 Re-release; 24 July 2006; 23 October 2006	25 July 2006	Episode synopsis, actor profiles, from cinema to the small screen, The history of RoboCop, fun facts and info, weapons, the car, the suit.

== Merchandise ==
An action figure collection for the series was produced by little-known Toy Island, a company that would continue making RoboCop figures in the future. The basic series includes RoboCop, Madigan, Stan Parks, Commander Cash (also released as "Commandant Cash"), and Pudface. It also features the OCP Interceptor, Tactical Field Vehicle, Tactical Field Ambulance, Mobile Armored Detention Vehicle, and Cryochamber playset. In 1995, the Power Glow figure series was released. This includes RoboCop variations with illuminating armor such as a basic RoboCop (blue), Thermo Shield RoboCop (red), and Xicor Shield RoboCop (lime green). Each figure in the collection includes various accessories and several points of articulation.
