= Leo Wu =

Chinese actor (born 1999)

- 吴磊
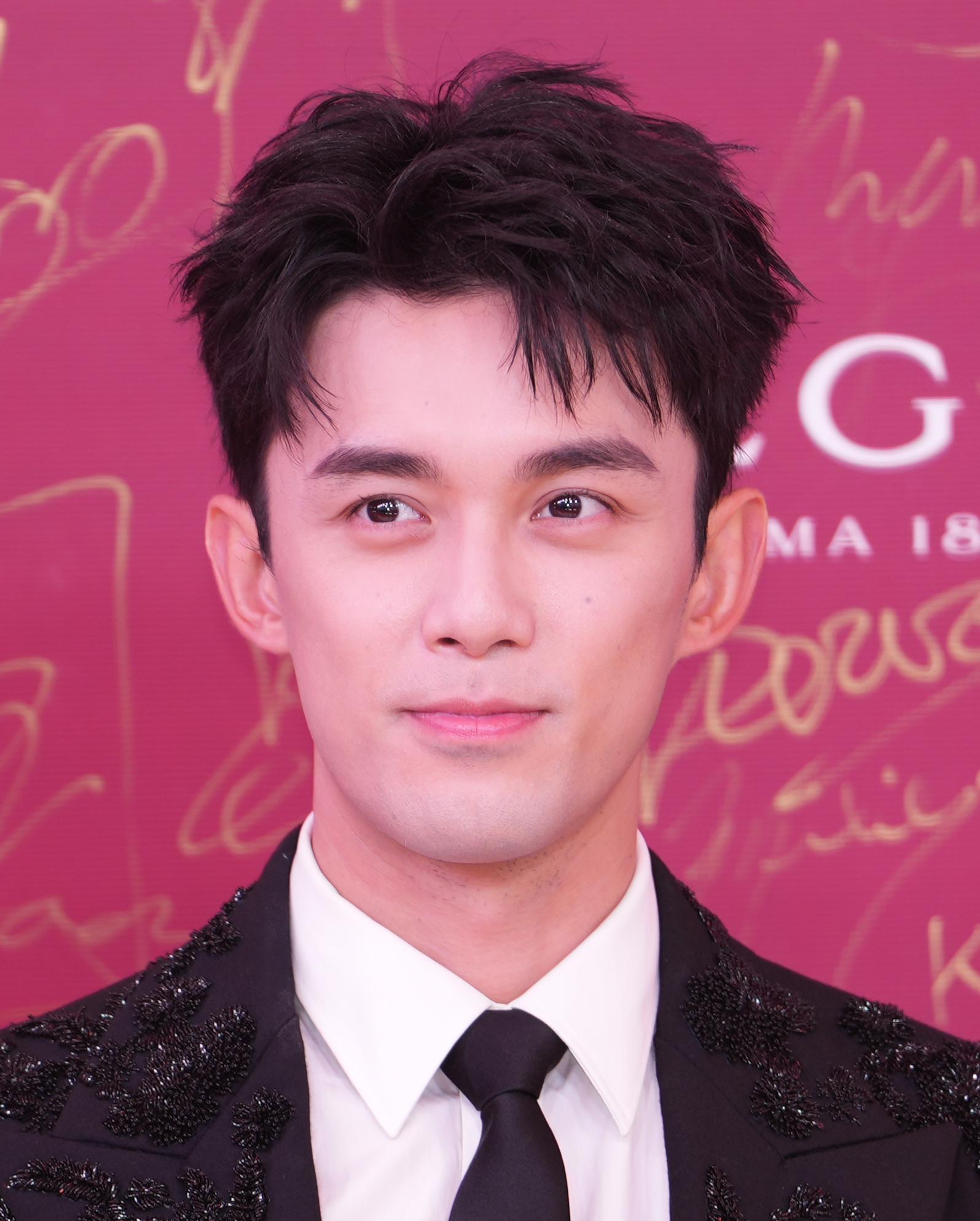
- Wu at 2026 Shanghai International Film Festival
- Born: December 26, 1999 (age 26); Shanghai, China
- Other names: LeiLei (磊磊), Three Stone Little Brother(三石弟弟), China's Little Brother (国民弟弟)
- Education: Beijing Film Academy
- Occupation: Actor
- Years active: 2002–present
- Agent: Wu Lei Studio

Chinese name
- Traditional Chinese: 吳磊
- Simplified Chinese: 吴磊
Transcriptions
Standard Mandarin
- Hanyu Pinyin: Wú Lěi

Wu Lei (simplified Chinese: 吴磊; traditional Chinese: 吳磊, born December 26, 1999), also known as Leo Wu, is a Chinese actor. He started appearing in commercials at the age of three. In 2007, he made his acting debut as Nezha in the series The Legend and the Hero. He is known for his supporting roles in Nirvana in Fire (2015) and The Whirlwind Girl (2015) and for his starring roles in Fight Breaks Sphere (2018), Tomb of the Sea (2018), The Long Ballad (2021), and Love like The Galaxy (2022). Wu ranked 63rd on Forbes China Celebrity 100 list in 2017, 29th in 2019 and 47th in 2020.

== Early life and education ==
Wu Lei was born in Shanghai on December 26, 1999 and was raised in Chengdu, Sichuan. In 2018, Wu entered Beijing Film Academy, placing first on the entrance examination.

== Career ==
=== 2002–2013: Beginnings ===
Wu Lei was scouted when he was 3. Thereafter, he appeared in the commercial of Chinese dietary supplement brand Huang Jin Da Dang in 2002. Subsequently, he was featured in more than fifty commercials and made minor appearances in shows for the next two years.

He took on his first scripted role in the Chinese television drama The Young Warriors (2006). That same year, he began his first professional training in acting. During one of the classes, a director came to scout for young actors. Coincidentally, Wu was in the restroom and almost missed the scouting. Determined to not miss this opportunity, he raced after the leaving crew to have his photo taken. To his surprise, he was chosen, and subsequently made his debut in The Legend and the Hero (2007) where he portrayed Nezha.

Wu gained attention for his roles in the children television dramas Home with Aliens (2009) and Naughty Boy Xiaotiao Ma (2010), for which he won the Outstanding Child Actor award at the Flying Apsaras Awards. He further raised his profile with his role in wuxia drama Little Heroes (2012).

By the age of 10, he has already appeared in twenty to thirty shows.

=== 2014–present: Rising popularity and transition to lead roles ===
In 2014, Wu appeared in the wuxia series Romance of the Condor Heroes produced by Yu Zheng. In 2015, he starred in the web drama Pal Inn and endorsed the video game of the same name. This was followed by a supporting role in youth sports drama The Whirlwind Girl and historical drama Nirvana in Fire. In 2017, Wu took on his first small screen leading role in the fantasy web series Magic Star. He also co-starred in the British-Chinese action thriller S.M.A.R.T. Chase directed by Charles Martin; as well as Chinese-New Zealand production Into the Rainbow.

In 2018, Wu starred in the fantasy epic Asura. Then he appeared in the fantasy adventure series The Tomb of Sea, written by the author of Daomu Biji; and Battle Through the Heavens, a fantasy action drama based on the popular xianxia novel of the same name. The same year, he acted in the historical film Shadow by Zhang Yimou. Forbes China listed Wu under their 30 Under 30 Asia 2017 list which consisted of 30 influential people under 30 years old who have had a substantial effect in their fields. In 2019, Wu was part of the ensemble cast of the romance film Adoring.

In 2020, Wu appeared in the historical fantasy drama Guardians of the Ancient Oath, and esports drama Cross Fire. In 2021, Wu co-starred in the acclaimed historical series The Long Ballad alongside Dilraba Dilmurat; his portrayal received high praise, further boosting his popularity. The same year, he was featured in coming-of-age film Upcoming Summer by Leste Chen, the drama Our Times and war film Windriders directed by Wu Jing as part of the four-part anthology My Country, My Parents. While filming a scene on set in August 2021, a prop malfunctioned and exploded in Wu's face. Only after finishing filming that day did he head to the hospital. There, it was revealed that numerous wounds were left on his face from the shrapnel, some of which almost ended up in his eyes. He has made a recovery since then.

In 2022, he starred in the popular historical romance series Love like The Galaxy alongside Zhao Lusi. Wu Lei was cast in the films Dwelling by the West Lake by Gu Xiaogang and All Ears by Liu Jiayin, and the metropolitan romance drama Nothing but You along with Zhou Yutong. On February 22, 2022, He was named Loewe global brand ambassador. In 2024, he starred in the popular romantic drama Amidst a Snowstorm of Love alongside Zhao Jinmai.

== Filmography ==
=== Film ===
| Year | English title | Chinese title | Role | Ref. |
|---|---|---|---|---|
| 2006 | Legend of Northern Wei | 北魏传奇之宏图恨 | Tuo Baxun | |
| 2009 | Zone of Death | 火线追凶之死亡地带 | Xiao Hu | |
| 2009 | Shun Shun and Yang Yang | 川川和洋洋 | Yang Yang | |
| 2010 | Heaven Eternal, Earth Everlasting | 80'后 | young Mingyuan | |
| 2017 | S.M.A.R.T. Chase | 极智追击：龙凤劫 | Dingdong Tang | |
| 2017 | Into the Rainbow | 奇迹：追逐彩虹 | Xiao Cheng | |
| 2018 | Asura | 阿修罗 | Ruyi | |
| 2018 | Shadow | 影 | Yang Ping | |
| 2019 | Zhui Ji | 坠机 (Short film) | | |
| 2019 | Adoring | 宠爱 | Chen Leyun | |
| 2021 | Upcoming Summer | 盛夏未来 | Zheng Yuxing | |
| 2023 | Papa | 学爸 | Xiao Wang | |
| 2023 | All Ears | 不虚此行 | Xiao Yin | |
| 2024 | Dwelling by the West Lake | 草木人间 | He Mulian | |
| 2024 | The Hutong Cowboy | 爆款好人 | Zhang Xiaojing | |
| 2025 | Dongji Rescue | 东极岛 | Ah Dang | |
| TBA | Decent Things | 入型入格 | Ye Hongwang | |
| TBA | The Decisive Moment | 群星闪耀时 | TBA | |

=== Television series ===
| Year | English title | Chinese title | Role | Network | Ref. |
|---|---|---|---|---|---|
| 2006 | The Young Warriors | 少年杨家将 | young Yang Yanzhao | CTV | |
| 2006 | Everlasting Regret | 长恨歌 | Mao Mao | Shanghai Channel, Jiangsu Channel | |
| 2006 | The Senior General Chen Geng | 陈赓大将 | Zhi Fei | CCTV | |
| 2006 | Five Disciples of Master Huang | 黄飞鸿五大弟子 | Huang Liwei | CTS, Guangzhou TV | |
| 2006 | Hu Jia Han Yue | 胡笳汉月 | Tuoba Xun | | |
| 2007 | The Legend and the Hero | 封神榜之凤鸣岐山 | young Nezha | Jilin TV | |
| 2007 | Daughter-in-Law's Tears | 媳妇的眼泪 | young Minghui | Sichuan Channel | |
| 2007 | The Sword and Chess of Death | 魔剑生死棋 | Guan Yunbao | | |
| 2007 | Shun Niang | 顺娘 | Chen Jingshui | CTS, Shanghai TV | |
| 2008 | Pearl Love | 新还君明珠 | young Majun | Hangzhou TV | |
| 2008 | Fu Gui Zai Tian | 富贵在天 | Cheng Yan | CNTV | |
| 2008 | Ning Wei Nu Ren | 宁为女人 | Si Chen | | |
| 2008 | Pretty Pearl | 大珍珠 | Wen Jing | CCTV, CTS | |
| 2008 | Life and Death | 生死谍恋 | Xiao Zhi | Zhengzhou TV | |
| 2008 | Mother Married for Me | 妈妈为我嫁 | young Wai Kaicheng / Hong Jiahui | | |
| 2008 | Chuan Niang Wen Hui | 船娘文慧 | Jia Yang | Shanghai Channel | |
| 2008 | Xue Zhong Hong | 雪中红 | young Gu Zhihao / Gu Zhizhong | Shanghai Channel | |
| 2008 | Spring Goes, Spring Comes | 春去春又回 | | Shandong TV | |
| 2009 | Justice Bao | 新包青天 | Crown Prince Renzong | | |
| 2009 | Mysterious House | 深宅 | Qiao Wei | Qinghai TV | |
| 2009 | Home with Aliens | 家有外星人 | Tang Buku | Guangdong TV | |
| 2009 | Nan Wei Nu Er Hong | 难为女儿红 | Ding Zhongxing | Jiangsu Channel | |
| 2009 | Mother and Wife | 娘妻 | Gao Yaozong | Anhui TV | |
| 2010 | Who Knows the Female of the Women | 谁知女人心 | Fu Xi'er | Jiangsu Channel | |
| 2010 | Blood War | 风雨雕花楼 | Gu Daxin | Anhui TV | |
| 2010 | Horizon True Heart | 天涯赤子心 | Xiao Bao | Anhui TV | |
| 2011 | Love is a Little Blue | 爱情有点蓝 | Mao Mao | Zhejiang TV | |
| 2011 | Mo's Mischief | 淘气包马小跳 | Ma Xiaotiao | CCTV | |
| 2011 | Utopia Office | 乌托邦办公室 | Mu Xingnan | Youku | |
| 2011 | Family Reunion | 团圆 | young Liu Shiwen | TVB | |
| 2011 | The Emperor's Harem | 后宫 | young Wang Zhi | Zhejiang TV | |
| 2012 | Little Heroes | 自古英雄出少年 | Zhao Yang (Da Zhangfu) | Guangdong TV | |
| 2012 | Grandma Loves Me Once Again | 奶奶再爱我一次 | Huang Yingsheng | Anhui TV | |
| 2012 | My Mother is an Angel | 我的妈妈是天使 | Jiang Xiaoqiang | Jiangxi TV | |
| 2013 | The Victor | 怒海情仇 | young Chengyi | Jiangsu Channel | |
| 2013 | The Mother's Heart | 娘心 | young Wang Minghui/Wang Tiancheng | Jiangxi TV | |
| 2013 | Shuo Hao Bu Liu Lei | 说好不流泪 | Ling Tianyou | Liaoning Channel | |
| 2013 | Red Sedan Chair | 红轿子 | young Che Wenxuan | Huzhou Channel | |
| 2014 | Stepmother's Spring | 后妈的春天 | young Tiexiong | Guangdong Channel | |
| 2014 | The Romance of the Condor Heroes | 神雕侠侣 | young Yang Guo | Hunan TV | |
| 2015 | Pal Inn | 仙剑客栈 | Li Xiaoyao / Yi Pin | Youku | |
| 2015 | The Whirlwind Girl | 旋风少女 | Hu Yifeng | Hunan TV | |
| 2015 | Nirvana in Fire | 琅琊榜 | Fei Liu | Beijing TV, Dragon TV | |
| 2015 | The Legend of Qin | 秦时明月 | Zi Ying (Voice cast) | Hunan TV | |
| 2016 | The Imperial Doctress | 女医·明妃传 | Zhu Jianshen | Dragon TV, Jiangsu TV | |
| 2016 | Far Away Love | 远得要命的爱情 | Meng Xiang | Dongnan TV, Guangdong TV | |
| 2016 | The Classic of Mountains And Seas | 山海经之赤影传说 | Shi Peipei | Hunan TV | |
| 2016 | The Whirlwind Girl 2 | 旋风少女2 | Hu Yifeng | Hunan TV | |
| 2017 | Magic Star | 奇星记之鲜衣怒马少年时 | Zhan Xiongfei | Youku | |
| 2018 | The Tomb of Sea | 沙海 | Li Cu | Tencent | |
| 2018 | Battle Through the Heavens | 斗破苍穹 | Xiao Yan | Hunan TV, CCTV | |
| 2020 | Guardians of the Ancient Oath | 山海经之上古密约 | Baili Hongshuo | Hunan TV | |
| 2020 | Shi Cha Hai | 什刹海 | Xiang Dong | CCTV | |
| 2020 | Cross Fire | 穿越火线 | Lu Xiaobei | Tencent | |
| 2021 | The Long Ballad | 长歌行 | Ashile Sun | Shandong TV, Tencent | |
| 2021 | Our Times | 启航当风起时 | Xiao Chuang | Tencent | |
| 2022 | Love like the Galaxy | 星汉灿烂 | Ling Buyi | Tencent | |
| 2023 | Nothing But You | 爱情而已 | Song Sanchuan | Tencent, CCTV | |
| 2024 | Amidst a Snowstorm of Love | 在暴雪时分 | Lin Yiyang | Tencent, Dragon TV | |
| 2024 | Northwest Years | 西北岁月 | Xi Zhongxun (young) | Tencent, CCTV | |
| TBA | Nirvana in Fire Season 3 | 琅琊榜3 | Uncle Cao Guo (young) | | |
| TBA | The One | 剑来 | Chen Ping'an | Tencent | |

=== Variety shows ===
| Year | English title | Chinese title | Role | Ref. |
|---|---|---|---|---|
| 2015 | Smart 7 | 好好学吧 | Cast member | |
| 2016 | Twenty-Four Hours | 二十四小时 | Cast member | |
| 2017 | Twenty-Four Hours Season 2 | 二十四小时第二季 | Cast member | |
| 2017 | 72 Floors of Mystery | 七十二层奇楼 | Cast member | |
| 2018 | Who's the Keyman | 我是大侦探 | Cast member | |
| 2019 | The Inn | 亲爱的·客栈 | Cast member | |

== Discography ==
| Year | English title | Chinese title | Album | Ref. |
|---|---|---|---|---|
| 2017 | "When I was Young" | 儿时 | | |
| 2017 | "The First Lesson" | 第一课 | First Class of New Semester OST | |
| 2019 | "We Are All Dream Chasers" | 我们都是追梦人 | Performance for CCTV New Year's Gala | |
| 2019 | "Adoring" | 宠爱 | Adoring OST | |
| 2020 | "Cross Fire" | 穿越火线 | Cross Fire OST | |
| 2024 | "Love & Shine" | | Amidst a Snowstorm of Love OST | |

== Accolades ==
=== Awards and nominations ===
| Year | Award | Category | Nominated work | Result | Ref. |
|---|---|---|---|---|---|
| 2011 | 28th Flying Apsaras Awards | Best Young Actor | Mo's Mischief | Won | |
| 2015 | 7th China TV Drama Awards | Most Promising Actor | Leo Wu | Won | |
| 2015 | 4th iQIYI All-Star Carnival | Most Popular Newcomer | Leo Wu | Won | |
| 2016 | 16th Top Chinese Music Awards | Most Popular TV Idol | Leo Wu | Won | |
| 2016 | 19th Huading Awards | Best Newcomer | Nirvana in Fire | Nominated | |
| 2016 | 10th Tencent Video Star Awards | Rising Artist of the Year | Leo Wu | Won | |
| 2016 | Youku Young Choice Awards | Most Talented Idol | Leo Wu | Won | |
| 2017 | Netease Crossover Awards | Most Popular Actor | Leo Wu | Won | |
| 2017 | L'Officiel Fashion Night Influence Award | Hot Era Reader | Leo Wu | Won | |
| 2017 | 11th Tencent Video Star Awards | Doki Influential Artist of the Year | Leo Wu | Won | |
| 2018 | Weibo Movie Awards Ceremony | Popular Actor Award | Leo Wu | Won | |
| 2018 | L'Officiel Night | Generation Breakthrough Award | Leo Wu | Won | |
| 2018 | 25th Cosmo Beauty Ceremony | Beautiful Young Idol | Leo Wu | Won | |
| 2018 | 12th Tencent Video Star Awards | Rising TV Actor | Leo Wu | Won | |
| 2019 | China Literature Award Ceremony | Super IP Actor | Leo Wu | Won | |
| 2019 | 2018-2019 Golden Data Entertainment Award | Web Drama Views Contribution Award (Actor) | The Tomb of Sea | Won | |
| 2019 | Next Generation Influencers for Global Philanthropy | Young Philanthropy Star | Leo Wu | Won | |
| 2019 | Cosmo Glam Night | Person of the Year (Dream) | Leo Wu | Won | |
| 2019 | 26th Huading Awards | Top Ten Favorite Actors | Leo Wu | Won | |
| 2019 | 16th Esquire Man At His Best Awards | Quality Artist of the Year | Leo Wu | Won | |
| 2020 | The 8th Vancouver Chinese Film Festival | Best Popularity Awards | Leo Wu | Won | |
| 2021 | Weibo Movie Night | Expected Actor of the Year | Leo Wu | Won | |
| 2022 | 7th China Online Video Academy Awards | Best Actor | Leo Wu | Won | |
| 2022 | 18th Chinese American TV Festival - Golden Angel Awards | Outstanding Actor of the Year | Love Like The Galaxy | Won | |
| 2023 | Weibo Night | Most Eye-Catching Actor of the Year | | Won | |
| 2023 | 36th Tokyo International Film Festival | Best Actor | Dwelling By The West Lake | Nominated | |
| 2023 | 4th New Era International Film Festival | Most Challenging Actor in the New Era | All Ears | Nominated | |
| 2023 | GQ Men of the Year | Rising Actor of the Year | Leo Wu | Won | |
| 2023 | Tencent Video Star Night | Outstanding Artist of the Year | Leo Wu | Won | |
| 2024 | Weibo Night | Quality Actor of the Year | Leo Wu | Won | |
| 2024 | China Quality TV Drama Awards | Quality Influence Drama Star of the Year | Leo Wu | Won | |
| 2025 | Tencent Video Star Night 2024 | Influential TV Drama Actor of the Year | Leo Wu | Won | |
| 2025 | Weibo Night 2024 | Quality Actor of the Year | Leo Wu | Won | |
| 2025 | CMG 3rd Annual Chinese TV Drama Festival | Breakthrough Actor of The Year | Leo Wu | Won | |

=== Forbes China Celebrity 100 ===
| Year | Rank | Ref. |
|---|---|---|
| 2017 | 63rd | |
| 2019 | 29th | |
| 2020 | 47th | |
