= Wang Runze =

Chinese actor

- Born: November 28, 1993 (age 32); Huainan, Anhui, China
- Other names: Runze Wang, Run Hou Tang
- Education: Anqing Normal University
- Occupation: Actor
- Years active: 2017–present
- Agent: Mango Pictures

Wang Runze (Chinese: 王润泽; pinyin: Wáng Rùnzé, born November 28, 1993), also known as Runze Wang, is a Chinese actor. He portrayed Tian Ye in the Meteor Garden 2018. Wang is also well known for his roles in A Little Thing Called First Love (2019), Professional Single (2020) and Don't Disturb My Study (2021).

== Early life ==
Wang Run Ze was born on November 28, 1993, in Huainan, China. He graduated from Anqing University where he studied financial management. He had a passion in acting since childhood.

== Career ==
In 2016, he participated in the recording of Hunan Satellite TV's original campus documentary reality show "First Grade Graduation Season"; during this period, he not only took the t-show in Shanghai Fashion Week, but also played a drug seller in the graduation stage play "Legend of swordsman".

In 2017, Zhang Yuge and Qiao chuhang took the lead in starring in the mysterious campus network drama "The King Of School Flowers In Tianxia", which is his first film and television drama work, and thus officially entered the performing arts circle as an actor. In the same year, he co-starred in the crime suspense network drama "Visible Lie", which is adapted from the horror suspense novel "Mystery Case Chasing Murderer".

In 2018, he starred in the youth love idol drama "Meteor Garden 2018".

On July 2, 2019, he starred in the Tencent video All-Star Basketball Competition Reality Show "Super Penguin League Super 3: Star Field".

In 2019, he starred in TV series "A Little Thing Called First Love", which premiered in the youth progressive theater of Hunan Satellite TV, playing Lin Kai Tuo.

In 2020, he starred in "Professional Single" as Song Siyi.

In June 2020, he was cast in the leading youth growth drama "Don't Disturb My Study" (2021) as Liu Yu Bai alongside Lai Kuan-lin and Li Landi as the main leads.

On March 8, 2021, the youth growth drama "Don't Disturb My Study" premiered in the youth progressive theater of Hunan Satellite TV.

On May 26, 2021, he starred as a main lead in "Maid Escort".

== Filmography ==
=== Television series ===
Year	Title	Original title	Role	Network	Notes	Ref.
2017	Campus Beauty 2	贴身校花之君临天夏	Zhang Fab	Sohu TV	Support Role	
2018	Imagine Me Without You	假如没有遇见你	Lin Ke	Youku	Guest Role	
2018	Meteor Garden 2018	流星花园	Tian Ye	Hunan TV	Support Role	
2019	A Little Thing Called First Love	初恋那件小事	Lin Kai Tuo	Hunan TV, Tencent	Main Role	
2020	Youth Unprescribed	非处方青春	Sun Shi Zen	Youku	Support Role	
2020	With You	在一起	Hospital Employee	Dragon TV	Guest Role	
2020	Professional Single	我凭本事单身	Song Si Yi	Mango TV	Support Role	
2020	Eternal Love Rain	倾世锦鳞谷雨来	Ning Xiu Rui	iQiyi	Main Role	
2021	Don't Disturb My Study	别想打扰我学习	Liu Yu Bai	Mango TV	Support Role	
2021	Maid Escort	这丫环我用不起	Yang Xiao	iQiyi	Main Role	
2024	Amidst a Snowstorm of Love	在暴雪时分	Li Qingyan	Tencent Video	Support Role	
TBA	Come On! Programmers	加油吧！程序员			Main Role	
TBA	Guardians of the Dafeng	大奉打更人	Zhu Guangxia			

=== Reality shows ===
Year	Title	Chinese title	Note	Ref.
2018	Super Penguin League; Season:3	超级企鹅联盟super3	Player; Live Basketball Competition	
