= Wang Bowen discography =

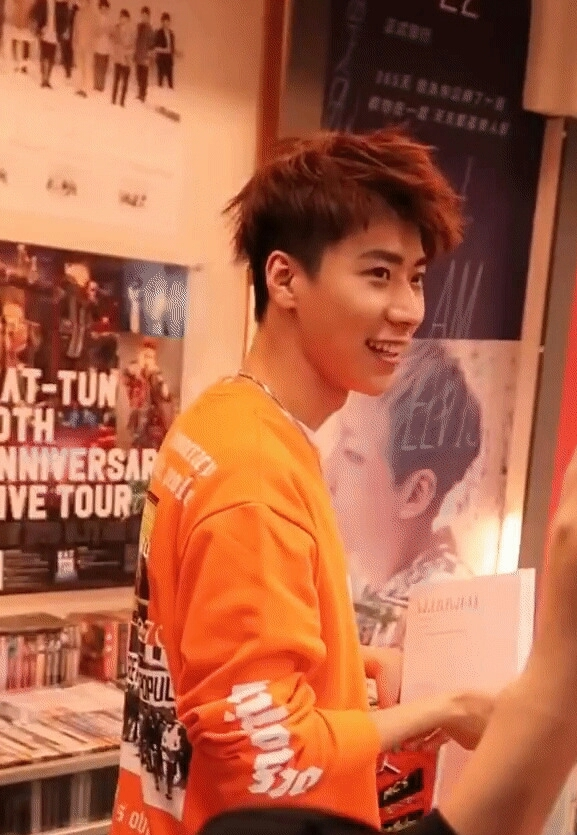
- EPs: 2
- Soundtrack albums: 1
- Singles: 10

This is the discography of Chinese singer Wang Bowen. In China, he has sold over 200,000 units albums. His expanded discography consists of two extended plays, one soundtrack and ten singles.

== Albums ==
Title	Album details
1461	Released: December 14, 2017; Label: JSJ International Entertainment Ltd.; Formats: Digital download

== Extended plays ==
Title	Album details
重生	Released: October 29, 2014; Label: Awesome Productions Sdn Bhd; Formats: CD, digital download
W.Bowen	Released: September 24, 2016 (China), October 14, 2016 (Taiwan); Label: Beijing Diantong Culture & Arts Co. Ltd.; Formats: CD, digital download

== Soundtracks ==
Title	Album details
梦 (Dream)	Released: August 3, 2016; Label: Beijing Diantong Culture & Arts Co. Ltd; Formats: Digital download

== Singles ==
Single	Year	Peak chart positions			Album
Single	Year	HKG	JPN	TWN	Album
"那个他.是我"	2014	—	—	—	重生
"重生"	2014	32	—	—	重生
"轻羽飞扬" Wang Bowen & 李根	2014	15	—	—	
"我的他加她"	2015	—	—	—	
"最需要的时候你离开" Wang Bowen & 汪睿	2015	45	—	58	
"等雨停停"	2015	37	—	—	
"妈妈的牵挂"	2016	1	—	—	
"星空下的秘密"	2016	3	—	—	W.Bowen
"我想你永远不会知道"	2016	5	—	—	W.Bowen
"—" denotes releases that did not chart * denotes a song that charted but its peak position is unknown

== As featured artist ==
Title	Year	Peak chart positions			Album
Title	Year	HKG	TWN	JPN	Album
"123 新年好" (Crayon Pop featured Wang Bowen X 魏一宁 X 陈骁)	2016	8	—	28	
