= Midnight Warrior =

- Directed by: Joseph Merhi
- Written by: Charles T. Kanganis
- Produced by: Joseph Merhi; Richard Pepin
- Starring: Kevin Bernhardt
- Cinematography: Richard Pepin
- Edited by: Paul G. Volk
- Music by: John Gonzalez
- Production company: PM Entertainment
- Distributed by: Raedon Entertainment Group Inc.
- Release date: April 3, 1989
- Running time: 85min
- Country: United States
- Language: English

Midnight Warrior is a 1989 thriller film directed by Joseph Merhi and starring Kevin Bernhardt, Bernie Angel and Lilly Melgar. The film follows stringer Nick Branca as he is pushed into more and more dangerous situations by his boss, Buddy, in order to land a lucrative contract with a news network.

== Plot ==
Stringer Nick Branca (Bernhardt) is considering getting out of the sensationalist TV news business when he and his partner, Sam (Marty Brinton), are called to a jumper on Hollywood Boulevard. Despite it being a great scoop, Nick's conscience gets the better of him and he tries to talk the woman down but is unsuccessful. He gives the footage to a distressed man claiming to be the dead woman's husband, but he turns out to be a rival stringer, costing Nick and Sam thousand of dollars.

On his next assignment, Nick defies police orders to go into a car wreck to rescue a trapped woman seconds before the car explodes. Sam captures everything and the network pays through the nose for the footage. The networks dangle a large two-year contract in front of Nick and his boss, Buddy (Bernie Angel), if they can continue supplying them with top material. Nick's assignments get gradually more and more dangerous until he is almost killed in a shootout.

Nick falls in love with Angelina (Lilly Melgar) and decides he wants out of the stringer business, but Buddy refuses to let him go as it will nullify his contract with the network. But Nick is determined to settle down, so Buddy takes things into his own hands to ensure Nick stays making him money.

== Cast ==
- Kevin Bernhardt as Nick Branca
- Bernie Angel as Buddy
- Lilly Melgar as Angelina Mantucci
- Rita Rogers as Rose Branca
- Marty Brinton as Sam
- Heidi Paine as Liz Brown
- David Parry as Eddie Colfax

== Release ==
The film was released by on VHS by the Raedon Entertainment Group Inc. on 3 April 1989 and sold 4,631 copies by mid-June, when Raedon re-released the film with a new VHS sleeve. The original sleeve featured only the star Kevin Bernhardt with a TV camera, but Raedon's new sleeve added a naked woman holding a gun in one hand, and her other arm wrapped around Bernhardt's shoulders. "Packaging is everything" said Raedon president Dennis Donavan, "Most people don't know what they are going to rent when they go into a video store. With the right type of packaging you can get people to rent a film they are not familiar with".

== Reception ==
Variety gave the film a positive review saying "modestly lensed, pic is buoyed by a persuasive Bernhardt performance and capable supporting cast." later adding, "The topic of tv news as exploitation remains a timely one and is treated convincingly here".
