= Kevin Bernhardt =

American screenwriter, actor and producer

- Born: Daytona Beach, Florida, U.S.
- Occupations: Screenwriter, producer, actor
- Years active: 1985–present
- Spouse: Apollonia Kotero (1987–1997)

Kevin Bernhardt is an American screenwriter, actor and producer. He started acting on television, with contract roles on Dynasty in 1989 and General Hospital (1985–1986). Subsequently he appeared in various films, until the mid-1990s when he focused on writing.

== Early life and education ==
Bernhardt was born in Daytona Beach, Florida, where he was adopted by Navy Damage Control Officer 'Red' and wife Beverly. After completing bachelor's degrees in Economics and Drama he went to Los Angeles in January 1984.

== Filmography ==
Year	Title	Writer	Producer
1995	The Immortals	Yes	Yes
1997	Top of the World	No	Yes
1997	Natural Enemy	Yes	No
1998	Sweepers	story	No
1999	Diplomatic Siege	Yes	No
1999	Turbulence 2: Fear of Flying	Yes	No
1999	Jill Rips	Yes	No
2000	Amazing Grace	No	Yes
2005	Virginia	Yes	No
2006	Peaceful Warrior	Yes	No
2010	Elephant White	Yes	No
2015	Winning: The Racing Life of Paul Newman	No	Executive
2015	Ghoul	No	Executive
2017	The Shanghai Job	Yes	No
2018	Shiner	Yes	No
2019	Cliffs of Freedom	Yes	No
2020	Echo Boomers	Yes	Executive
2021	Best Sellers	No	Executive
2022	Medieval	No	Executive

=== In development ===
Project	Credit	Ref.
Angel of Florence and Normandie	Screenwriter	
The Bangkok 6	Screenwriter	
Ben & Mei	Screenwriter, Producer	
Black Sunday	Screenwriter	
Catgut	Screenwriter	
The Dove	Screenwriter	
Lookalikes	Screenwriter	
The Man Who Would be King	Screenwriter	
Only in America	Screenwriter	
Return From Tomorrow	Screenwriter	
Twilight's Last Gleaming	Screenwriter	
Upon This Rock	Screenwriter	
Yakudoshi: Age of Calamity	Screenwriter	

Uncredited revisions

- Hollow Point (1996)
- Top of the World (1997)
- The Peacekeeper (1997)
- Five Aces (1999)
- The Art of War (2000)
- 3000 Miles to Graceland (2001)
- Black Friday (2001)
- One Last Dance (2003)
- Valiant (2005)
- Rambo (2008)

=== Unproduced projects ===
Year	Title	Description	Ref.
2000s	Johnny Frankenstein	A contemporary take on the "Frankenstein" tale.	
2000s	The Charm School	An adaptation of the Nelson DeMille novel of the same name.	
2000s	Coup D'Etat	A script co-written with Abel Ferrara that was to be produced by Franchise Pictures	
2000s	Jax of Heart aka Mandrake	A modern day action-adventure that that Mimi Leder would have directed; the project was initially based on the comic strip character Mandrake the Magician.	
2010s	The Genesis Code	An adaptation of the John Case book of the same name	
2010s	Pretty Boy Floyd	A biopic of the legendary outlaw that Wayne Kramer was set to direct for Myriad Pictures	
2010s	Joe Serial Killer	A comedy that would have been directed by Dale Melgaard	

Other credits

Year	Title	Role
2000	Agent Red	Original Screenplay
2002	Trapped	Additional Material
2010	Lifted	Special Thanks
2018	Kingdom Come: Deliverance	Story Consultant
2019	Chance	Special Thanks
2022	Medieval	Writing Supervisor
2025	Kingdom Come: Deliverance II	Story Consultant

Special thanks

- Five Aces (1999)
- Naked Fame (2005)
- Winning: The Racing Life of Paul Newman (2015)
- Rambo: Last Blood (2019)
- African Redemption: The Life and Legacy of Marcus Garvey (2022)
- Galaxy Built on Hope (2022)
- Medieval (2022)

=== Acting roles ===
Film

Year	Film	Role	Notes
1985	Le feu sous la peau	Raphael	
1987	Kick or Die	Don Potter	
1988	Counterforce	Sutherland	
1989	Midnight Warrior	Nick Branca	
1992	Hellraiser III: Hell on Earth	J.P Monroe	
1993	Beauty School	Colt	
1993	Treacherous	Damon Vasquez	
1995	The Immortals	Billy Knox	
1997	Top of the World	Dean	
2017	Hate Crime	Tom Brown	
2018	Shiner	Happy McBride	
2022	Medieval	Captain Martin	

Television

Year	Show	Role	Notes
1984–1986	General Hospital	Frisco Jones, Kevin O'Connor	15 episodes as Frisco Jones, 310 episodes as Kevin O'Connor
1989	Dynasty	Father Tanner McBride	
1989	Superboy	Dr. Byron Shelley	
1993	Dark Dreams	Bart	TV Movie
