= A Little Thing Called First Love =

Chinese television program

- Simplified Chinese: 初恋那件小事
- Hanyu Pinyin: Chūliàn nà jiàn xiǎoshì
- Genre: Teen drama
- Screenplay by: Zhao Qianqian
- Directed by: Qi Xiaohui
- Starring: Zhao Jinmai; Lai Kuan-lin
- Ending theme: "Can You Feel My Heart? (你能感受到我的心吗)" by Wang Bowen
- Country of origin: China
- Original language: Mandarin
- No. of seasons: 1
- No. of episodes: 36

Production
- Producers: Wang Ke; Zhang Yuehua
- Production locations: Shenzhen and Huizhou University, China
- Running time: 45 minutes
- Production companies: Mango Film and Television; Fenghehui Culture Media Co., Ltd.

Original release
- Network: Tencent Video; Hunan Broadcasting System
- Release: 23 October – 21 November 2019

Related
- Crazy Little Thing Called Love

A Little Thing Called First Love (Chinese: 初恋那件小事; pinyin: Chūliàn nà jiàn xiǎoshì) is a 2019 Chinese television series starring Zhao Jinmai and Lai Kuan-lin, adaptated from a Thai film First Love. It aired on Hunan TV between October 23 and November 21, 2019, every Tuesday and Friday for 36 episodes. The filming started on February 1 and ended on May 7, 2019.

== Plot ==
Xia Miaomiao (played by Zhao Jinmai), a shy yet artistic student, develops a crush on a handsome talented classmate, Liang Younian (Lai Kuan-lin). She embarks on a journey of self-discovery through college. With the help of her friends, Miaomiao starts to learn about fashion, join art clubs, and study hard to improve her grades.

== Cast ==
=== Main ===
- Lai Kuan-lin as Liang Younian, a straight and top student who majors in architecture like her late mother. He and Lin Kaituo were good friends, but broke off because Kaituo's mom married his dad. Younian initially thought that Miaomiao was just his sister, but later realizes that he has feelings for her. He confesses to her after she confessed to him earlier. He was given the chance to go to the Edinburgh University as an exchange student, but gave up after offered to work for the project that his mom left off.
- Zhao Jinmai as Xia Miaomiao, an ordinary schoolgirl with average looks and grades who ended up being a pretty and excellent fashion designer after having a crush on her upperclassman, Liang Younian. Initially an introvert, Miaomiao eventually confesses to him that resulted in them becoming a couple. She applies as an exchange student at the Birmingham University and returns to China afterwards.
- Wang Runze as Lin Kaituo, a boy who was good friends with Liang Younian, but began to estrange him after his mom and Younian's dad got married. He always wanted to get better than Younian and was admitted to the architecture department of Haicheng University. Kaituo does part-time jobs and never asks his parents for money. He likes Miaomiao and confessed his love to her, only to get rejected.
- Chai Wei as He Xin, Liang Younian's younger cousin and Xia Miaomiao's best friend who majors in journalism at Haicheng University. She has developed a crush on Lin Kaituo since childhood, but estranged him after he confessed his love to Miaomiao, leading Hexin to stop liking him ever since.

=== Supporting ===
==== People at Haicheng University ====
- Wang Yimiao as Lin Xia, Xia Miaomiao and He Xin's best friend who studies fashion design.
- Wang Bowen as Wang Yichao, Liang Younian and Lin Kaituo’s best friend. Studies fashion designing at Haicheng University. He likes Fang Xiaoyue and later becomes a couple with her.
- Joe Xu as Lu Peng, Xia Miaomiao, Lin Kaituo, and He Xin's math teacher in high school. He is Li Sichen's nephew.
- Eva Lu as Jia Yin, a fashion design teacher who has a crush on Lu Peng but got rejected. A quirky and enthusiastic woman who persuades Xia Miaomiao to switch to her department and admires her.
- Hu Wei as Li Sichen, an architecture teacher and disciples of Liang Younian's mom who likes Jia Yin, but always asks his nephew to pursue her.
- Damon Xue as Li Ran, Liang Younian's dormmate.
- Zhu Jintong as Fang Xiaoyue, daughter of the founder of Fang's Group who studies architecture at Haicheng University and likes Liang Younian. She decides to move forward when Younian and Miaomiao were together, becomes attached to Wang Yichao.
- Chen Kefan as Wang Yutian, a fashion design student who has liked Xia Miaomiao since he saw her at Liang Gang's drawing class.
- Elkie Chong as Yang Manling, He Xin's senior in journalism.
- Li Ximeng as Tang Mengfei, a fashion design student who dislikes anyone except Liang Younian. She cares about her appearance and becomes am model.
- Alex as Wang Fang

==== Others ====
- Zhang Ziyu as Xia Yaoyao, Xia Miaomiao's younger sister.
- Wang Yichan as Li Junman, Xia Miaomiao's mother who made her enter the architecture departement.
- Zhao Ke as Xia Jiansheng, Xia Miaomiao's father who works as a sailor and loves his children very much.
- Ran Qian as Yang Xue, Lin Kaituo's mother who has tried hard to treat both Liang Younian and Lin Kaituo well.
- Zhao Ke as Liang Gang, Liang Younian's father and an art teacher who still supports his son's choice on entering the architecture department despite his rejection.

== Original soundtrack ==
A Little Thing Called First Love OST (初恋那件小事 原声大碟)
| No. | Title | Singer | Length |
|---|---|---|---|
| 1. | "First Love (初恋)" (Theme song) | Lai Kuan-lin |
| 2. | "Can You Feel My Heart? (你能感受到我的心吗)" (Ending theme) | Wang Bowen |
| 3. | "Live in Your Heart (住在你的心脏)" | Huang Kun |
| 4. | "Destiny (命运)" | Lin Yiling |
| 5. | "I Can Only Leave (我只能离开)" | Yan Renzhong |
