= Drifting Away (TV series) =

2025 Chinese television series

- Traditional Chinese: 漂白
- Simplified Chinese: 漂白
- Literal meaning: "Bleach"
- Hanyu Pinyin: Piǎobái
- Genre: Crime; Thriller; Suspense
- Based on: Bleach (漂白) by Chen Ping (陈枰)
- Written by: Chen Ping
- Directed by: Cao Kai
- Starring: Guo Jingfei; Wang Qianyuan; Zhao Jinmai
- Opening theme: "Belief" (信念) by Chen Chao (陈超)
- Ending theme: "Nightmare" (梦魇) by Chen Chao (陈超)
- Country of origin: China
- Original language: Mandarin
- No. of episodes: 14

Production
- Executive producers: Gong Yu, Liu Xiaofeng, Zhang Yudong
- Producers: Ma Hao, Wang Xiaoyan, Li Ping, Jiang Dongmei, Zhao Ran
- Cinematography: Li Xi
- Running time: 45 minutes
- Production company: IQiyi; Qiguang Studio; Jiangsu Straw Bear Film Industry; Nanjing Good Friends Film Industry; Shanghai Film Studio; Zhuhai Jiudian Film Industry; Beijing Good Wish Film & Television; Qingdao Tongmeng Film & Television

Original release
- Network: IQiyi
- Release: 17 January – 22 January 2025

Drifting Away is a crime thriller drama produced by iQiyi, Jiangsu Straw Bear Pictures, Good Friends Pictures, and Paihaoxi Pictures, directed by Cao Kai, written and supervised by Chen Ping, starring Guo Jingfei, Wang Qianyuan and Zhao Jinmai with special appearances by Ren Zhong, Wang Jiajia, and Zong Juntao. The drama is adapted from Chen Ping's novel of the same name. and premiered on iQiyi's Mist Theater on January 17, 2025.

== Synopsis ==
The drama tells the story of police captain Peng Zhaolin ( played by Guo Jingfei ), who missed a crucial opportunity to apprehend suspect Deng Ligang (played by Wang Qianyuan ) ten years ago, allowing Deng to escape. Deng then vanished without a trace, leaving Peng Zhaolin filled with remorse and relentlessly pursuing him. Ten years later, Deng commits another crime, prompting Peng Zhaolin to reopen the investigation. Meanwhile, Zhen Zhen ( played by Zhao Jinmai ), who had previously been kidnapped by Deng Ligang but managed to escape, becomes a police officer and joins the hunt. Peng Zhaolin leads his team in a battle of wits and courage against the cunning and ruthless Deng Ligang and his criminal gang, overcoming numerous obstacles on their path to truth and justice, determined to bring the criminals to justice, uncover the truth, and deliver vindication to the victims.

== Cast ==
=== Main Characters ===
Guo Jingfei as Peng Zhaolin

A resolute and righteous criminal police captain, after missing the opportunity to arrest suspect Deng Ligang, fell into deep remorse and embarked on a ten-year journey to apprehend the criminal.

Wang Qianyuan as Deng Ligang

The murder suspect is ruthless and elusive. The criminal gang he leads commits extremely cruel crimes, including kidnapping, extortion, and dismemberment. After disappearing without a trace, they commit crimes again.

Zhao Jinmai as Zhen Zhen

She was once a victim of Deng Ligang and others. After cleverly escaping during her kidnapping, she worked hard to pass the police academy entrance exam and became a policewoman. Together with Peng Zhaolin, she investigated a cold case from ten years ago.

Ren Zhong as Shi Bi

The members of Deng Ligang's criminal gang all had honest-looking faces, but when it came to killing, they were swift and decisive.

Wang Jiajia as Song Hongyu

Deng Ligang's lover, who was once his victim, was responsible for finding targets within the criminal gang and bringing them to the gang; she was the bait.

Zong Juntao as Ji Dashun

He was a henchman and driver in Deng Ligang's criminal gang, mainly responsible for disposing of corpses or cleaning up after the gang's escape.

=== Other Characters ===
- Zhang Xinyi plays Cheng Guo, Peng Zhaolin's wife. (Special appearance)
- Ge Si plays Huang Laoqi, Deng Ligang's cousin. (Special appearance)
- Zhai Xiaoxing plays Director Jiang (guest appearance).
- Jie Bing plays Director Xu (guest appearance).
- Jiang Feng plays Li Jianfeng (guest appearance)
- Zhao Qian plays Hong Xia, Zhen Zhen's mother.
- Zhao Qi plays Zhen Liyang (Yu Liang), Zhen Zhen's father.
- Wei Qing plays Zhang Nianci, Deng Ligang's mother.
- Chen Yu-che / Ren Qi-guang play Peng Cheng, Peng Zhao-lin's son.
- Fang Yuanyuan plays Qiu Feng, who was once a victim of Deng Ligang and others, but later escaped successfully with Zhen Zhen.
- Xue Yubin plays Deng Lide, Deng Ligang's younger brother, a released prisoner.

== Production ==
The filming of the drama was announced to begin on February 28, 2024, and was announced to have wrapped up on April 18 of the same year.

== Controversy ==
Wang Meng, a former reporter for Southern Metropolis Daily, accused the drama of plagiarizing his in-depth report "Bleaching" published in Southern Metropolis Daily in 2012. He pointed out that there were 17 instances of plagiarism in the original novel and that the drama's creative team did not contact him or Southern Metropolis Daily in advance. Chen Ping, the author of the original novel, responded by denying the plagiarism accusation. Chen Ping said that the novel's content came from his interviews with the investigators and parties involved in the "Yang Shubin gang 911 murder and dismemberment case". The "Bleaching" production team responded that the film and television adaptation rights were purchased from Chen Ping's novel of the same name. The contract signed by both parties stipulated that Chen Ping would bear the corresponding responsibility for any disputes arising from the original novel. The production team called on and actively promoted full communication and proper resolution among all parties involved.

The promotion of the drama was questioned for its entertainment of crime, and the adaptation of the original case information and characters was accused of whitewashing criminals and hurting the feelings of victims.

On February 22, 2025, a two-minute video of the filming of the drama was leaked online. The poster questioned whether the filming vehicle had run over the head of a female stunt double, causing her injury, which drew public attention to the safety of the actress involved. A Weibo user who claimed to be the producer of the drama posted that "It is normal for accidents to happen during filming, don't stir up trouble" and was criticized by netizens. Shortly afterward, the account deleted the relevant content of the drama. On the afternoon of the 22nd, the Weibo user who claimed to be the stunt double and the drama crew responded on Weibo, saying that the situation on the scene was that the actress had abrasions on her arm, no head collision or injury, and was fine.
