= Ode to the Spring =

- Chinese: 你是我的春天
- Hanyu Pinyin: Nǐ Shì Wǒ Dě Chūntiān
- Directed by: Zhou Nan; Zhang Chi; Tian Yusheng; Dong Tue; Rao Xiaozhi
- Written by: Yuan Yuan; Zhou Nan; Zhang Chi; Liu Bohan; Shang Chengjun; Shi Chenyun; Zhu Bo; Dong Yue; Rao Xiaozhi; Zhang Kang; Hui Xiaoli; Lin Li
- Produced by: Chen Daoming; Huang Bo
- Starring: Zhou Dongyu; Yin Fang; Song Xiaobao; Pan Binlong; Wang Jingchun; Zhao Jinmai; Song Jia; Huang Xiaoming
- Production companies: China Film Press Co., Ltd.; Wanda Media Co. Ltd.; Wuhan Culture Investment Development Group Co., Ltd.; Changying Group Co., Ltd.; Tianjin Maoyan Weiying Culture Media Co., Ltd.; Emei Film Group Co., Ltd.
- Release date: 1 July 2022 (China)
- Running time: 122 minutes
- Country: China
- Language: Mandarin

Ode to the Spring (Chinese: 你是我的春天; pinyin: Nǐ Shì Wǒ Dě Chūntiān) is a 2022 Chinese drama film directed by Zhou Nan, Zhang Chi, Tian Yusheng, Dong Tue and Rao Xiaozhi and starring Zhou Dongyu, Yin Fang, Song Xiaobao, Pan Binlong, Wang Jingchun, Zhao Jinmai, Song Jia and Huang Xiaoming. This film follows the story of ordinary people in Wuhan, Hubei fighting against the COVID-19 pandemic in early 2020. The film was theatrically released on 1 July 2022.

== Cast ==
- Zhou Dongyu as Shang Xiaoyu
- Yin Fang as Li Nanfeng
- Song Xiaobao as Liu Erhong
- Pan Binlong as Wang Dapeng
- Wang Jingchun as Old Wang
- Zhao Jinmai as Zhao Xiaomai
- Huang Xiaoming as Li Jing
- Song Jia as Wang Ya'er
- Huang Chao as Gong Chen
- Bolo Yeung as Yang Shan
- Zhang Hangcheng as Le Le
- Rossi Zheng as Doctor Zhong
- Zeng Mengxue as Xiao Xue
- Fu Yushu as Zhang Jing
- Wu Yanshu
- Li Naiwen
- Zhao Liang
- Jia Ling
- Zhang Ziyi
- Xiao Yang
- Zhang Zifeng
- Chen Baoguo
- Yu Qian
- Du Jiang
- Yao Chen
- Shen Teng
- Xu Zheng
- Jin Dong
- Zhu Yilong

== Production ==
Ode to the Spring was produced by the China Film Association.

== Release ==
Ode to the Spring was released on 1 July 2022, in China, and on 8 July 2022, in the United Kingdom.

== Reception ==
Douban, a major Chinese media rating site, gave the drama 4.6 out of 10.
