= Bliss Media =

Chinese film company

Bliss Media Limited
- Company type: Private
- Industry: Entertainment industry
- Founded: Shanghai, China (2011)
- Founder: Wei Han, CEO & President, Film Producer
- Headquarters: Shanghai, China
- Number of locations: 2 (with office also in Los Angeles, California, United States
- Products: Motion pictures
- Website: blissmedialtd.com

Bliss Media is a Chinese film company specializing in international film financing, production and distribution. The company was founded in 2011 and now holds offices in both Shanghai and Los Angeles. It has been involved in the investment, production and distribution process of international feature films including Hacksaw Ridge, Jackie, and Loving. Hacksaw Ridge ultimately became the highest grossing imported war film in China.

== Founder ==
The founder of Bliss Media is Chinese American producer Wei Han. She has a background in investment banking. She has also been part of the executive producer team for the 2016 movie Jackie.

== Filmography ==
Year	Title	Notes
2013	The Lovers (known as Time Traveller in UK)	One of the production companies
2016	Hacksaw Ridge	Acquired Chinese distribution rights
2016	Jackie	One of the production companies; acquired Chinese distribution rights
2016	Loving	Its affiliate company Insiders is in charge of international sales
2017	S.M.A.R.T. Chase	One of two production companies & co-distributor
2017	Kings	One of the production companies & co-distributor
2020	Resistance	One of the production companies
2022	The Moon & the Sun (known as The King's Daughter going forward)	One of the production companies
2023	Ferrari	uncredited; One of the production companies
