= Irresistible Love =

- Directed by: Sun Cheng Zhi, Meng Rui
- Written by: Lan Lin
- Produced by: Sun Cheng Zhi, Yin Xing Liang, Dong Guan Jie, Wang Jin Cao, Guo Jing, Xu Liang & Hu Meng
- Starring: Meng Rui; Wang Bowen.
- Release dates: 28 June 2016 (Season 1); 20 August 2016 (Season 2)
- Running time: 1 hour 14 minutes 15 seconds (Season 1); 1 hour 33 minutes 59 seconds (Season 2)
- Country: People's Republic of China
- Language: Chinese

Irresistible Love (Chinese: 不可抗力) also known as Uncontrolled Love), is a 2016 Chinese movie starring Meng Rui and Wang Bowen. The movie was directed by Sun Cheng Zhi and Meng Rui, and its novel was written by Lan Lin. The novel is also known by another name "Force Majeure".

The first movie came out on June 28, 2016, while the second movie came out on August 20, 2016.

During the last 10 minutes and 18 seconds of Season 2, there were two different story endings: one ending with Shu Nian dying due to a car accident, and the 2nd ending with Shu Nian involved in a car accident, after which he was disfigured and limping, where Xie Yan manages to find him in another town three years later.

== Synopsis (Season 1) ==
A young Shu Nian is a lonely kid who is living in an orphanage, where he hopes to find a good family that loves him. This is when Xie Yan, the son of a real estate magnate, adopts him. The latter is two years younger than Shu Nian. Twenty years later, Xie Yan returns home from London after spending six years abroad and is reunited with Shu Nian. Shu Nian bumps into Ke Luo, who is also adopted from an orphanage and is a 20% shareholder of Ke's Holdings.

Both Shu Nian and Ke Luo become close; Shu Nian treats Ke Luo as his little brother. On the other hand, Jiang Yao, a ruthless and crafty girlfriend of Xie Yan starts to plot her revenge against Shu Nian after Xie Yan dumps her, as Jiang Yao found out a secret that involves a box full of photos of Xie Yan.

Xie Yan is homophobic and doesn't know that Shu Nian is gay, and to make matters worse, Shu Nian falls for Xie Yan, and Xie Yan manages to find out and asks him to leave to study abroad. Shu Nian comes back in secret and works in a club where he meets Ke.

A friendship ensues. Jiang Yao found Shu Nian and in revenge, for she is unable to deal with the breaking up with Xie Yan, engages some men to rape Shu Nian, but Xie Yan saves him. after Xie Yan realizes that Shu Nian is the only one who can help to cool off his hot temperedness and gradually has a different feeling about him.

== Synopsis (Season 2) ==
Continued from the previous season, both Xie Yan and Shu Nian were still unable to deal with their feelings for each other, but Xie Yan realizes that Shu Nian is the one for him, but Shu Nian continues to hide from Xie Yan. Meanwhile, Ke Luo created a ruckus in the company's dinner organized by Xie's Holdings, but is saved by Shu Nian for the second time. Xie Yan is then sent overseas for a project, and Shu Nian and Ke Luo gets closer after celebrating Ke Luo's birthday.

Eventually, Ke Luo confessed his feelings to Shu Nian, who will soon be away to study, but the latter's heart is still with Xie Yan. Xie Yan later breaks up with Jiang Yao, and Xie Yan's mind confusion has an impact on his future fiancé, Xia Jun. Xia Jun uses her crafty ideas to get to Xie Yan, but later Xie Yan tells Xia Jun that he has already gotten a new love and that the person is Shu Nian.

Later Xia Jun contracts food poisoning and is sent to hospital. Shu Nian is later fired by Xie Yan's father, after confessing to Xie Yan that he was the one who poisoned her. In the end, the medical report is produced, showing that Xia Jun's food poisoning is due to the three cups of mocha that she had drunk hours before she was about to meet Shu Nian.

=== Ending Part: Bad news ===
Three months later, Xie Yan received a phone call which announced that Shu Nian had died during a car accident. When he was sent to the hospital, he could have been saved but because he had no money for any medical treatments, he passes away. Shu Nian's death left Xie Yan devastated, and so he isolated himself from the rest of the world.

=== Ending Part: Good news ===
Three years later, while at another city working for a project with Ke's Holdings, Xie Yan bumps onto Ke Luo, who informs him that one year ago, Shu Nian transferred the 20% of shares back to Ke Luo. Leaving the location for Xie Yan, since Ke Luo was unable to locate him in that city, Xie Yan rushes to that city and searches for Shu Nian, and miraculously bumps into him. However Xie Yan is shocked to hear that Shu Nian had had a car accident three years earlier, and sees that half of his right face is disfigured and that he had been left with a limp in his left leg. The two later confess their feelings for each other and kiss.

== Cast ==
Character	Portrayed by
Xie Yan	Meng Rui
Shu Nian	Wang Bowen
Jiang Yao	He Ya Meng
Xia Jun	Li Na
Ke Luo	Zhou Jun Chao
Xie Yan's father	Guo Han
Xie Yan's mother	Liu Xia
Young Xie Yan	Cai Quan En
Young Shu Nian	Cai Zhuo En
Manager Zhao	Liu Huan
Church Nun	Li Dan Yi
Secretary	Chen-Ding Wen Si
Chen Bo	Quan Li Bao
