= Diplomatic Siege =

- Directed by: Gustavo Graef-Marino
- Screenplay by: Robert Boris; Mark Amin; Kevin Bernhardt; Sam Bernard
- Story by: Mark Amin
- Produced by: Peter Abrams; Robert L. Levy; Natan Zahavi
- Starring: Peter Weller; Daryl Hannah; Tom Berenger
- Cinematography: Steven Wacks
- Edited by: Sherwood Jones
- Music by: Terry Plumeri
- Production company: Tapestry Films
- Distributed by: Trimark Pictures
- Release date: 1999
- Running time: 90 minutes 91 minutes
- Country: United States
- Language: English

Diplomatic Siege is a 1999 American direct-to-video action film directed by Gustavo Graef-Marino and starring Peter Weller, Daryl Hannah and Tom Berenger.

== Plot ==
When Steve Mitchell is covertly dispatched to the US embassy in Bucharest, Romania, to neutralize a long-undetected nuclear device left there since the Cold War's conclusion, he finds himself entangled in unforeseen complications. Teaming up with Erica Long, a diplomatic attaché whose true identity remains obscured, they must collaborate to input the correct computer code, deactivating the weapon and fulfilling the mission. However, while monitoring video feeds from an abandoned surveillance room, Steve witnesses an unexpected and perilous takeover of the embassy by the Serbian Liberation Front. Thirty-seven individuals, among them Steve's stepson, are held hostage, with demands for the immediate release of their incarcerated leader, accused of war crimes against humanity. They threaten to execute a hostage every hour unless their demand is met. With time running out, the Pentagon's Joint Chiefs of Staff dispatch General Swain to quell the deadly siege and avert the looming threat of a nuclear detonation.

== Cast ==
- Peter Weller as Steve Mitchell
- Daryl Hannah as Erica Long
- Tom Berenger as General Buck Swain
- Adrian Pintea as Goran Mladenov
- Irina Movila as Petra
- Uwe Ochsenknecht as Colonel Peter Vojnovic / Giorgio Borghelli
- Brion James as General Stubbs

== Reception ==
John Ferguson of Radio Times awarded the film awarded the film two stars out of five and wrote that it has "an illogical plot and lame dialogue."

TV Guide gave a mixed review: "This far-fetched cold war thriller would've been more fun to watch had its creative personnel taken a more intentional tongue-in-cheek approach; as it is, the stars veer over the top whenever the action flags, but this comic attack seems less a desire to kid the material than an attempt to camouflage its weaknesses. Thanks to their chemistry together, Hannah and Weller's anti-extremist heroics compel attention far more than the Swain-versus-Goran contretemps. In fact, Berenger's scenes as Swain seem tacked-on for added marquee power, but far worse is the rickety script's unmasking of a truly preposterous surprise traitor."
