= Peter Weller =

American actor (born 1947)

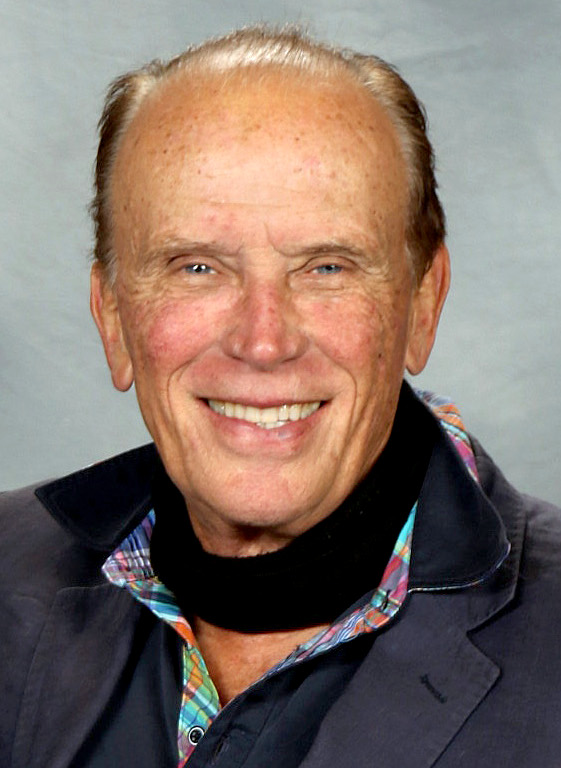
- Weller at Paradise City Comic Con in 2016
- Born: Peter Francis Weller; June 24, 1947 (age 79); Stevens Point, Wisconsin, U.S.
- Education: University of North Texas (BA); Syracuse University (MA); University of California, Los Angeles (PhD)
- Occupations: Actor; television director
- Years active: 1973–present
- Spouse: Shari Stowe (m. 2006)
- Children: 2

Academic background
- Thesis: Alberti Before Florence: Early Sources Informing Leon Battista Alberti's De Pictura (2014)
- Doctoral advisor: Charlene Villaseñor Black

Peter Francis Weller (born June 24, 1947) is an American actor and television director. He has appeared in more than 70 films and television series, including RoboCop (1987) and its sequel RoboCop 2 (1990), in which he played the titular character, The Adventures of Buckaroo Banzai Across the 8th Dimension (1984), and Star Trek Into Darkness (2013). He appeared in such films as Woody Allen's Mighty Aphrodite (1995), the Oliver Stone-produced The New Age (1994), and David Cronenberg's adaptation of William Burroughs's novel Naked Lunch (1991).

In addition to a Saturn Award nomination for his RoboCop role, he received an Academy Award nomination for his 1993 short Partners, in which he also acted. In television, he hosted the program Engineering an Empire on the History Channel from 2005 to 2007. He played Christopher Henderson in the fifth season of 24, Stan Liddy in the fifth season of the Showtime original series Dexter, and Charles "Charlie" Barosky in 11 episodes in the sixth season of Sons of Anarchy. From 2012 to 2017, he was involved in the A&E (now Netflix) series Longmire as a director and actor. In 2017, he appeared on The Last Ship as Dr. Paul Vellek. He reprised his role as RoboCop by providing his voice for Mortal Kombat 11 in 2019 and RoboCop: Rogue City in 2023.

He holds a PhD in Italian Renaissance art history from UCLA.

== Early life and education ==
Weller was born in Stevens Point, Wisconsin, the son of Dorothy Jean (née Davidson), a homemaker, and Frederick Bradford Weller, a lawyer, federal judge, and career helicopter pilot for the United States Army. Weller had a "middle-class Catholic" upbringing and is of English, German, French and Irish descent. As a result of his father's army work, Weller spent many years abroad during his childhood. His family lived in West Germany for several years before eventually moving to Texas, where he attended Alamo Heights High School in San Antonio, graduating in 1965.

While enrolled at North Texas State University, now the University of North Texas, he played trumpet in one of the campus bands. He graduated with a bachelor of arts degree in theatre in 1970, and began his acting career after attending the American Academy of Dramatic Arts, where he graduated with the class of 1972.

In 2004, Weller completed a master of arts degree in Roman and Renaissance art at Syracuse University, and occasionally taught courses in ancient history at the university. In 2007, he began a PhD at UCLA in Italian Renaissance art history. He defended his dissertation in May 2013, and filed the completed manuscript in October 2013. The dissertation, titled Alberti Before Florence: Early Sources Informing Leon Battista Alberti's De pictura, led to him being awarded his doctorate in 2014.

== Career ==
=== Stage ===
Weller's stage career began in the 1970s with appearances on Broadway in Full Circle, directed by Otto Preminger, and Summer Brave, William Inge's rewrite of his play Picnic. About this time, he became a member of the Actors Studio.

In December 2006, Weller starred as architect Frank Lloyd Wright at Chicago's Goodman Theatre in the play Frank's Home, by Richard Nelson.

=== Film ===
Weller appeared in the 1982 film Shoot the Moon with Diane Keaton and Albert Finney. He played Keaton's love interest after her divorce from her husband, played by Finney.

He then appeared in the 1984 film Firstborn with Christopher Collet and Corey Haim, where he played the abusive boyfriend of Haim's mother (played by Teri Garr). During filming, he got into a physical altercation with Haim on-set. Weller later apologized to Haim, saying the altercation happened due to method acting.

Weller has appeared in more than 50 films and television series, including turns as the title character in The Adventures of Buckaroo Banzai Across the 8th Dimension (1984) and blockbuster hits RoboCop (1987) and RoboCop 2 (1990). He portrayed Starfleet Admiral Alexander Marcus in Star Trek Into Darkness in 2013 and has appeared in such critically acclaimed films as Woody Allen's Mighty Aphrodite (1995), the Oliver Stone-produced The New Age (1994), and David Cronenberg's 1991 film adaptation of William Burroughs's novel Naked Lunch.

In 1995, he appeared in Screamers, a science-fiction film based on the short story "Second Variety" by Philip K. Dick and directed by Christian Duguay.

=== Television ===
In a 1977 episode of the television series Lou Grant, he played Donald Sterner/Stryker, a tragically disillusioned Jewish-American Neo-Nazi leader who later committed suicide off-screen when his heritage was discovered.

On television, he played the shuttle captain in the short-lived series Odyssey 5 and made guest appearances as Terran supremacist John Frederick Paxton in the Star Trek: Enterprise episodes "Demons" and "Terra Prime" and on Fringe as the character Alistair Peck.

Weller was a contributor to the History Channel in several productions, particularly as the host for the series Engineering an Empire. He was credited as "Peter Weller, Syracuse University", where he was an adjunct faculty member. He was later a graduate student in art history at UCLA, focusing on the Italian Renaissance.

In 2005, Weller co-starred as the captain in a made-for-television remake of The Poseidon Adventure.

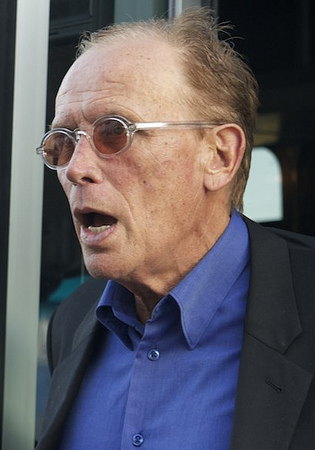
Weller at the Texas Theater in Dallas, Texas, in 2012

In 2006, Weller joined the cast of 24 as terrorist collaborator Christopher Henderson. Weller received a "cheer" in TV Guide's "Cheers & Jeers" section for his performance.

In 2010, Weller appeared in a teaser trailer for the companion documentary God of War: Unearthing the Legend that was featured in the game God of War III, which Weller also hosted. Also that year, Weller guest-starred in episodes of Fringe, Dexter, and Psych.

Since 2012, he is appearing in a recurring role as Lucien Connally on the crime drama television series Longmire.

In 2013, he played the part of the villain in the remake of the "Hookman" episode of the original Hawaii Five-O. The part was originally played in 1973 by Jay J. Armes. In seasons six and seven of Sons of Anarchy, he plays the ruthless ex-cop Charles Barosky, a boss at the Stockton port and has dealings with the SAMCRO motorcycle club.

In 2017, Weller began appearing as Dr. Paul Vellek, a scientist, on The Last Ship.

=== Directing ===
Weller has directed various projects for television, including episodes of Homicide: Life on the Street, Monk, and three episodes of Odyssey 5. He directed a 1997 adaptation of Elmore Leonard's Gold Coast starring David Caruso and Marg Helgenberger after previously starring in a version of Leonard's thriller Cat Chaser (1989). He has directed 11 episodes of the series Sons of Anarchy, two in season four, titled "Dorylus" and "Hands", three in season five, titled "Authority Vested", "Toad's Wild Ride", and "Darthy", three in season six, titled "One One Six", "Los Fantasmas", and "Aon Rud Pearsanta", and three in season seven, titled "Some Strange Eruption", "What a Piece of Work Is Man", and "Suits of Woe". He has directed one episode each season of Longmire since 2012.

Since 2018, Weller has directed episodes "Guts + Fuel + Hope" and "Banh Bao + Sterno + Drill + Burner + Mason" of MacGyver and episodes "Cry Murder" and "Whispers of Death" of Magnum P.I.

=== Voice acting ===
Weller voiced the character of Bruce Wayne / Batman in the two-part 2012–2013 animated adaptation of The Dark Knight Returns, and the titular character in the video game Wilson's Heart. He returned to voice RoboCop in a series of commercials for KFC and Mortal Kombat 11 in 2019, as well as RoboCop: Rogue City in 2023.

== Personal life ==
In 1980, Weller met Ali MacGraw during the making of Just Tell Me What You Want. They had an on-off relationship for several years.

On June 24, 2006, on his 59th birthday, Weller married his longtime girlfriend, actress Shari Stowe, at the Santa Maria Assunta church in Positano, Italy. Weller and Stowe have one son.

== Awards and nominations ==
- 1983: Paris Film Festival Award for Best Actor – Of Unknown Origin (Winner)
- 1988: Saturn Award for Best Actor – RoboCop (nominated)
- 1992: Genie Award for Best Performance by an Actor in a Leading Role – Naked Lunch (Nominated)
- 1994: Academy Award for Best Live Action Short Film – Partners (nominated)
- 2002: Independent Spirit Award for Best Supporting Male – Ivans XTC (nominated)
- 2011: Actor Award for Outstanding Performance by an Ensemble in a Drama Series – Dexter (nominated)
- 2013: Behind the Voice Actors Award for Best New Vocal Interpretation of an Established Character – Batman: The Dark Knight Returns, Part 1 (nominated)
- 2013: Behind the Voice Actors Award for Best Vocal Ensemble in a TV Special/Direct-to-DVD Title or Short – Batman: The Dark Knight Returns, Part 1 (nominated)
- 2014: Behind the Voice Actors Award for Best Vocal Ensemble in a TV Special/Direct-to-DVD Title or Short – Batman: The Dark Knight Returns, Part 2 (nominated)

== Filmography ==
=== Feature film ===
Year	Title	Role	Notes
1979	Butch and Sundance: The Early Days	Joe LeFors	
1980	Just Tell Me What You Want	Steven Routledge	
1982	Shoot the Moon	Frank Henderson	
1983	Of Unknown Origin	Bart Hughes	Paris Film Festival for Best Actor
1984	The Adventures of Buckaroo Banzai Across the 8th Dimension	Dr. Buckaroo Banzai	
1984	Firstborn	Sam	
1986	A Killing Affair	Baston Morris	
1987	RoboCop	Alex Murphy/RoboCop	Nominated – Saturn Award for Best Actor
1988	The Tunnel	Juan Pablo Castel	
1988	Shakedown	Roland Dalton	
1989	Leviathan	Steven Beck	
1989	Cat Chaser	George Moran	
1990	RoboCop 2	Alex Murphy/RoboCop	
1991	Road to Ruin	Jack Sloan	
1991	Naked Lunch	William "Bill" Lee	Nominated – Genie Award for Best Performance by an Actor in a Leading Role
1992	Fifty/Fifty	Jake Wyer	
1993	Sunset Grill	Ryder Hart	
1994	The New Age	Peter Witner	
1995	Beyond the Clouds	Husband	
1995	Screamers	Commander Joseph A. Hendricksson	
1995	Mighty Aphrodite	Jerry Bender	
1995	Decoy	Baxter	
1998	Top of the World	Ray Mercer	
1999	Diplomatic Siege	Steve Mitchell	
2000	Shadow Hours	Stuart Chappell	
2000	Falling Through	Lou	
2000	Contaminated Man	Joseph Müller	
2000	Ivans Xtc	Don West	Nominated – Independent Spirit Award for Best Supporting Male
2001	Styx	Nelson	Direct-to-video
2003	The Order	Cardinal Driscoll	
2005	Man of God	Rabbi	
2005	Undiscovered	Wick Treadway	
2006	The Hard Easy	Ed Koster	
2007	Prey	Tom Newman	
2007	Dating Vietnam	Jack Newton	
2010	Once Fallen	Eddie	
2011	Forced to Fight	Danny "Danny G"	
2012	Dragon Eyes	Police Chief Victor "Mr. V" Swan	
2012–2013	Batman: The Dark Knight Returns	Bruce Wayne / Batman (voice)	Direct-to-video
2013	Repentance	Meyer	
2013	Star Trek Into Darkness	Admiral Alexander Marcus	
2015	Skin Trade	Captain Costello	
2017	Yamasong: March of the Hollows	Brujt	
2022	In Search of Tomorrow	Himself	Documentary
2025	Bang	Morgan Cutter	
2026	The Further Mis-Adventures of Cliff Booth	Gus Booth	

=== Television film ===
Year	Title	Role	Notes
1973	The Man Without a Country	Lieutenant Fellows	
1975	The Silence	"Red" Sash	
1983	Kentucky Woman	Deke Cullover	
1983	Two Kinds of Love	Joe Farley	
1986	Apology	Rad Hungate	
1990	Women & Men: Stories of Seduction	Hobie	
1990	Rainbow Drive	Mike Gallagher	
1994	Partners	Doctor	Short film; also Director and Writer; Nominated – Academy Award for Best Live Action Short Film
1994	The Substitute Wife	Martin Hightower	
1994	Lakota Woman: Siege at Wounded Knee	Uncredited	
1995	Present Tense, Past Perfect	Charles	
1997	End of Summer	Theo Remmington	
1997	Gold Coast	—	Director and executive producer
1998	Tower of the Firstborn	John Shannon	
2000	Dark Prince: The True Story of Dracula	Father Stefan	
2005	The Poseidon Adventure	Captain Paul Gallico	

=== Television series ===
Year	Title	Role(s)	Channel	Notes
1977	Lou Grant	Donald Stryker	CBS	Episode: "Nazi"
1995–1996	Homicide: Life on the Street	—	NBC	Director; 2 episodes
1997	Michael Hayes	—	CBS	Director; Episode: "The Doctor's Tale"
2002–2003	Odyssey 5	Chuck Taggart	Space	19 episodes
2005	Star Trek: Enterprise	John Frederick Paxton	UPN	Episodes: "Demons"; "Terra Prime"
2005–2007	Engineering an Empire	—	History Channel	Host (14 episodes)
2006	Monk	Actor Playing Stottlemeyer	USA Network	Director — Episode: "Mr. Monk, Private Eye"; Actor — Episode: "Mr. Monk and the Actor"
2006	24	Christopher Henderson	Fox	11 episodes
2007	Las Vegas	—	NBC	Director; Episode: "A Cannon Carol"
2010	Fringe	Scientist Alistair Peck	Fox	Episode: "White Tulip"
2010	Psych	Mr. Yin	USA Network	Episode: "Yang 3 in 2D", also provided voice for Yin in "Mr. Yin Presents"
2010	Dexter	Stan Liddy	Showtime	8 episodes
2012	House	Dr. Penza	Fox	Episode: "Post Mortem"; Also director
2012	The Mob Doctor	—	Fox	Director; Episode: "Confessions"
2012–2017	Longmire	Lucian Connally	A&E; Netflix	Also director 4 episodes
2013	Hawaii Five-0	Curt Stoner	CBS	Episode: "Hookman"
2013–2014	Sons of Anarchy	Charlie Barosky	FX	10 episodes
2013–2018	Hawaii Five-0	—	CBS	Director; 15 episodes
2014	The Strain	—	FX	Director; 3 episodes
2014–2015	Under the Dome	—	CBS	Director; 2 episodes
2015	Justified	—	FX	Director; Episode: "Noblesse Oblige"
2015–2018	The Last Ship	Dr. Paul Vellek	TNT	8 episodes as director Recurring role in season 4
2015–2016	Tyrant	—	FX	Director; 3 episodes
2015	Sleepy Hollow	—	Fox	Director; Episode: "I, Witness"
2015–2016	Salem	—	WGN America	Director; 2 episodes
2016	Rush Hour	—	CBS	Director; Episode: "Two Days or The Number of Hours Within the Time Frame"
2016	Outsiders	—	WGN America	Director; Episode: "Long Live the Bre'lin"
2016	Game of Silence	—	NBC	Director; Episode: "Road Trip"
2017	Shades of Blue	—	NBC	Director; 2 episodes
2018–2021	MacGyver	Elliot Mason	CBS	Director — 3 episodes Actor — 3 episodes
2018	Forever	The Traveler	Amazon Prime	2 episodes
2018	Mr. Mercedes	—	Audience	Director; Episode: "Andale"
2018–2019	Mayans MC	—	FX	Director; 2 episodes
2018–2021	Magnum P.I.	—	CBS	Director; 5 episodes
2020	JJ Villard's Fairy Tales	Sergeant Hardcop	Adult Swim	Voice; 2 episodes
2022	Guillermo del Toro's Cabinet of Curiosities	Lionel Lassiter	Netflix	Episode: "The Viewing"
2023	Rabbit Hole	Crowley	Paramount+	3 episodes
2024–2025	Moon Girl and Devil Dinosaur	Dr. Stern (voice)	Disney Channel	2 episodes

=== Video games ===
Year	Title	Voice role	Note(s)
2005	Codename: Panzers – Phase Two	Jeffrey S. Wilson	
2014	Family Guy: The Quest for Stuff	RoboCop	
2016	Call of Duty: Infinite Warfare	Caleb Thies	"Know your enemy" trailer only, uncredited
2017	Wilson's Heart	Robert Wilson	
2020	Mortal Kombat 11: Aftermath	RoboCop	
2023	RoboCop: Rogue City	RoboCop	
2025	RoboCop: Rogue City - Unfinished Business	RoboCop / Alex Murphy	

== Bibliography ==
Weller, Peter. Leon Battista Alberti in Exile: Tracing the Path to the First Modern Book on Painting.Cambridge University Press. 2025
