= Top of the World (1997 film) =

- DVD cover
- Directed by: Sidney J. Furie
- Written by: Chap Taylor
- Produced by: Avi Lerner; Elie Samaha
- Starring: Peter Weller; Dennis Hopper; Tia Carrere; David Alan Grier; Cary-Hiroyuki Tagawa; Martin Kove; Kevin Bernhardt; Peter Coyote; Joe Pantoliano
- Cinematography: Alan Caso
- Edited by: Alain Jakubowicz
- Music by: Robert O. Ragland
- Production company: Millennium Films
- Distributed by: Trimark Pictures
- Release dates: September 10, 1997 (Hungary); September 26, 1998 (United States)
- Running time: 99 minutes
- Country: United States
- Language: English

Top of the World is a 1997 American action film directed by Sidney J. Furie and starring Peter Weller, Dennis Hopper and Tia Carrere. The supporting cast features David Alan Grier, Joe Pantoliano, Cary-Hiroyuki Tagawa, Peter Coyote, Martin Kove, and Ed Lauter. In the film, disgraced ex-cop Ray Mercer (Weller) and his wife Rebecca (Carrere) are trapped in a Las Vegas casino under siege by criminals, and must fight their way out.

The film was produced by Millenium Films and distributed by Trimark Pictures. In the United States, Top of the World bypassed theatrical distribution and was released direct-to-video on September 26, 1998.

== Plot ==
In Las Vegas for a quickie divorce, a just-paroled ex-cop and his wife wander into the Cowboy Country Casino, run by the shady Charles Atlas. They win big, right as the casino is being robbed. The police believe their big win was a staged diversion and the two of them become suspects. Over the course of the evening and next morning, the two attempt to escape the surrounded casino and prove their innocence, as well as save their marriage.

== Cast ==
- Peter Weller as Ray Mercer
- Dennis Hopper as Charlie Atlas
- Tia Carrere as Rebecca Mercer
- David Alan Grier as Det. Augustus
- Joe Pantoliano as Vince Castor
- Cary-Hiroyuki Tagawa as Capt. Hefter
- Peter Coyote as Tony "The Butcher" Borghesi
- Julie McCullough as Ginger
- Martin Kove as Carl
- Kevin Bernhardt as Dean
- Eddie Mekka as Joe Burns
- Ed Lauter as Mel Ridgefield
- Derek Anunciation as Fredo
- Dell Yount as Mac
- Alexander Mervin as Benny
- Gavan O'Herlihy as Lt. Logan
- Michael DeLano as Lt. De Rosa
- Paul Herman as the valet
- Larry Manetti as Morgan
- Lati Grobman as Cindy

== Production ==
Chap Taylor had written the screenplay on spec, describing it as Die Hard in a Las Vegas casino, Taylor and his agent had pitched the script to Paramount Pictures, but they weren’t interested. The script was then sent to producers Avi Lerner and Elie Samaha, who read the script and wanted to produce it.

According to Taylor, he saw an early cut of the film, and requested to have his name taken off, he was credited under the pseudonym, Bart Madison. Taylor further explained that an associate of Peter Weller's had rewritten the entire script.

Shooting took place on-location in Las Vegas, Nevada, and at the Hoover Dam.

== Release ==
The film premiered on video in Hungary in September 10, 1997, and was released in the United States on September 26, 1998. It received theatrical distribution in Singapore and Portugal.
