= 72 Floors of Mystery =

- 七十二层奇楼
- Genre: Game-variety show
- Based on: by the writer of Daomu
- Written by: Xu Lei
- Starring: Kris Wu; Zhao Liying; Leo Wu; Simon Yam; Wowkie Zhang; Wang Xiaoli
- Country of origin: China
- Original language: Chinese
- No. of seasons: 1
- No. of episodes: 12

Production
- Production location: China
- Running time: 80-100 minutes
- Production company: Hunan TV

Original release
- Network: Hunan TV
- Release: May 5 – July 28, 2017

72 Floors of Mystery (Chinese: 七十二层奇楼) is a 2017 Chinese adventure variety show on Hunan Television. The members of the cast are Kris Wu, Simon Yam, Leo Wu, Zhao Liying, Wowkie Zhang, Wang Xiaoli, Liu Chang, Waer. The team is tasked with solving mysteries that will aid in understanding the secret behind the 72-floor building. Each episode supposedly was a floor in the 72 story tower that the cast members solved.

The show premiered on May 5 via Hunan TV. It will air every Friday at 20:20 for 12 episodes.

== Team ==
Name	Age
Kris Wu	29
Simon Yam	62
Leo Wu	18
Zhao Liying	31
Wowkie Zhang	33
Wang Xiaoli	48
Liu Chang (helper)	
Waer (helper)	

== Guest ==
- 1st episode: William Chan
- 2nd episode: Yu Menglong
- 3rd episode: Kathy Chow
- 4th episode:
- 5th episode: Neo Hou
- 6th episode: Kong Chuinan
- 7th episode: Kong Chuinan
- 8th episode: Neo Hou, Calvin Du
- 9th episode: Guo Junchen, Peng Yuchang, Zhou You
- 10th episode: Zhou You, Guo Junchen, Meng Jia, Guo Jingfei
- 11th episode: Niu Junfeng, Zhou Yiwei, Zhou You, Zhang Yi
- 12th episode: Zhang Yi
