= Amidst a Snowstorm of Love =

Chinese television program

- Official poster
- Also known as: In the Middle of a Blizzard; During the Snowstorm
- Simplified Chinese: 在暴雪时分
- Hanyu Pinyin: Zài bàoxuě shífēn
- Genre: Romance; Sports
- Based on: "Amidst a Snowstorm of Love" (在暴雪时分) by Mo Bao Fei Bao
- Written by: Mo Bao Fei Bao
- Directed by: Huang Tianren; Yu Bo
- Starring: Leo Wu; Zhao Jinmai
- Opening theme: "Falling in Love" by Xu Song
- Ending theme: "Perfect Performance (完美表现)" by Yisa Yu
- Country of origin: China
- Original language: Mandarin
- No. of seasons: 1
- No. of episodes: 30

Production
- Executive producer: Gao Chen
- Production locations: Finland; France; Suzhou, China
- Running time: 45 minutes
- Production companies: Tencent Penguin Pictures; Jiaxing Media

Original release
- Network: Tencent Video; Dragon TV
- Release: February 2 – February 14, 2024

Amidst a Snowstorm of Love (Chinese: 在暴雪时分; pinyin: Zài bàoxuě shífēn) is a 2024 Chinese television series based on a Web novel with the same title by Mo Bao Fei Bao, starring Leo Wu and Zhao Jinmai. It aired in Tencent Video and Dragon TV on 2 February until 14 February 2024 everydays for 30 episodes. It also available on Netflix, Rakuten Viki, and Astro QJ.

== Synopsis ==
A former professional Snooker player Lin Yiyang (played by Leo Wu) and a famous Nine-ball athlete Yin Guo (played by Zhao Jinmai) met on a rare snowstorm night. With the help of Yin Guo's cousin, the two gradually get along with each other's and Yin Guo also learned about Yiyang's past. It turns out that he was once a sensational snooker genius. One day during a game, the young and arrogant Lin Yiyang refused to accept the referee's decision and directly announced his retirement. The appearance of Yin Guo changed Yiyang's life, make him not only began to pursue her hard, but also regained his original dream and returned to the professional billiards arena.

== Cast ==
=== Main ===
- Leo Wu as Lin Yiyang a.k.a. Duncuo
  - Qiao Yang as childhood Lin Yiyang
  - Gao Yier as teenage Lin Yiyang

A good-looking, genius yet aloof and distant Dongxin Snooker player who lost his parents in a car accident when he was young. He became He Wenfeng's last disciple and also the most talented one. One day, he disobeyed the referee's decision in a game and chose to retire from billiards. He slowly takes interest and develops feelings to Yin Guo.

- Zhao Jinmai as Yin Guo
  - Pan Yiqi as young Yin Guo

A sweet and shy Bei Nine-ball athlete who was born in a billiards family. She was trapped in Red Fish Bar in a snowstorm night, where she met Yiyang there. She gradually encourage him to return to the billiards arena.

- Wang Xingyue as Meng Xiaodong
  - Alan Luo as young Meng Xiaodong

A Bei Snooker player and Yin Guo's older cousin with cold personality who was once the world snooker champion, but retired. He seems resent Yiyang in the early episodes, but revealed to hope that Yiyang could comeback and not waste his billiards talent.

=== Supporting ===
==== People around Lin Yiyang ====
- Luo Yixin as Lin Yidong, Yiyang's younger brother.
  - Tang Hao as young Lin Yidong
- Liu Yichun as Lin Yidong's wife
- Huang Bosi as Ganzhe a.k.a. Xiaoyo, Yidong's daughter who likes Yin Guo very much.
- Zou Jixin as Sun Zhou, a man who helps Yiyang manage the underground billiards room.
- Xu Ruihao as Sun Yao, Sun Zhou's younger brother and Yiyang's apprentices.
- Huang Shilin as Xie Yaoyao, Yiyang's apprentices who signs up for the Nine-ball open competition.
- Liu Qianwen as Liu Yanyan, Yiyang's apprentices.
- Shi Ruiyi as Da Hao, Yiyang's apprentices who signs up for the Nine-ball open competition.
- Sun Xueyan as Uncle Qian, Yiyang's apprentices who signs up for the Nine-ball open competition.

==== People around Yin Guo ====
- Shi Yu as Yin Guo's father
- Tang Qun as Yin Guo's grandmother
- Jiang Hongbo as Wu Qian, Yin Guo's mother and the deputy leader of the referee team.
- Han Shumei as Yin Guo's aunt
- Wang Jiaxuan as Meng Xiaotian

Meng Xiaodong's younger brother who was also trapped in Red Fish Bar alongside Yin Guo, his older cousin. There, he befriends with Yiyang and Wu Wei.

- Hai Ling as Wu Tong, Yin Guo's half sister.
- Amy Sun as Zheng Yi, Yin Guo's best friend and Yiyang's schoolmate.
- Lu Meixi as Su Wei

==== Dongxin city Club ====
- Ding Xiaoying as Lin Lin

A Nine-ball player who retired and became a referee, is Meng Xiaodong's ex-girlfriend. She has a stern personality and is resolute in her work.

- Li Jianyi as He Wenfeng, Dongxin founder and coach to Yiyang and Jiang Yang.
- Meng Xiu as He Wenfeng's wife
- Gong Xiaorong as He Jia, Wenfeng's daughter.
- Chen Jingke as Jiang Yang, a Snooker player who became Wenfeng's disciple prior to Yiyang.
- Dong Zifan as Wu Wei, a man who is very good at create opportunities to bring Yin Guo and Yiyang together.
- Kong Ran as Fang Wencong, a Snooker player.
- Han Donglin as Chen An'an, a Nine-ball player.
  - Ai Yi as young Chen An'an
- Wang Yuexi as Liu Xiran, a Nine-ball player who was once retired, but comeback for her family's sake.
- Dai Si as Cheng Yan, a Nine-ball player who likes Yiyang.
- Yao Lichun as Coach Chen
- Kong Defeng as Coach Xin, Lin Lin's coach.
- Hai Ling as Wu Tong

==== Bei city Club ====
- Wang Runze as Li Qingyan, a Snooker player who has crush on Yin Guo.
- Xiong Aobo as Xiao Zi, a Snooker player who often follows Li Qingyan.
- Li Ao as Wen Xiao, a Nine-ball player and Yin Guo's best friend.
- Ding Xiaoming as Chen Fang, Yin Guo's coach.

==== Others ====
- Zhao Yansong as Wen Bin, the head coach of the national billiards team.
- Zhang Yiyang as a young master who has been pursued Yin Guo since a long time.
- Chen Yuzhe as Shi Tou, Jiang Yang's son (ep. 30)
- Li Bin as Li Qingyan's father
- Fang Xiaoyue as Li Qingyan's mother

== Original soundtrack ==
Amidst a Snowstorm of Love OST (在暴雪时分 原声大碟)
No.	Title	Lyrics	Music	Singer	Length
1.	"Falling in Love" (Opening theme)	Chen Xi	Dong Dongdong	Xu Song
2.	"Bitter Bitter Sweet"	Wang Jiuli	Dong Dongdong	Zhou Keyu
3.	"Perfect Performance (完美表现)" (Ending theme)	Chen Xi	Dong Dongdong	Yisa Yu
4.	"Snow Fate (雪缘)"	Chen Xi		Wang Yijin
5.	"Amidst a Snowstorm of Love (在暴雪时分)"	Chen Xi	Dong Dongdong	Deng Dian
6.	"Love and Shine"	Wang Jiuli	Dong Dongdong	Leo Wu
7.	"Love and Shine"	Wang Jiuli	Dong Dongdong	Zhou Keyu
8.	"I Want to Win (我要赢)"	Chen Xi	Dong Dongdong	Wang Heye
9.	"I Thought (我以为)"	Chen Xi	Dong Dongdong	Xu Tianqi
