= The Shanghai Job =

2017 film by Charles Martin

- Directed by: Charles Martin
- Screenplay by: Kevin Bernhardt
- Produced by: Wei Han; Ben Pugh
- Starring: Orlando Bloom; Leo Wu; Simon Yam; Hannah Quinlivan; Lynn Hung; Jing Liang; Da Ying; Yanneng Shi; Rong Chang; Tom Price
- Cinematography: Philipp Blaubach
- Edited by: James Hughes
- Production companies: Bliss Media (China); 42; Columbia Pictures (United States)
- Distributed by: Bliss Media (China); IMR International; Sony Pictures Releasing (United States)
- Release date: 30 September 2017
- Countries: China, UK
- Languages: English; Mandarin

The Shanghai Job (Chinese: 极致追击, S.M.A.R.T. Chase in North America) is a 2017 British-Chinese action thriller film by director Charles Martin, with a cast that includes Orlando Bloom, Leo Wu, Simon Yam, Hannah Quinlivan and Lynn Hung. The film was set for a 30 September 2017 release in China, with later dates for other countries.

== Plot ==
Danny Stratton, a washed-up private security agent, is given the rare opportunity to escort a valuable Chinese antique out of Shanghai, but is ambushed en route. With the safety of the woman he loves in jeopardy, Danny has to work with his Security Management Action Recovery Team members to save her, as a dreadful conspiracy begins to unravel.

== Cast ==
- Orlando Bloom as Danny Stratton
- Hannah Quinlivan as J. Jae Anh
- Simon Yam as Mach Ren
- Leo Wu as DingDong Tang
- Lynn Hung as Ling Mo, Daniel's girlfriend.
- Jing Liang, as Yen, a ruthless and cunning gang leader.
- Yanneng Shi
- Rong Chang
- Da Ying
- Tom Price as Ciem

== Production ==
=== Development ===
Formerly known as S.M.A.R.T. Chase: Fire & Earth, the shooting of the film ended in late 2016. Sino-American company Bliss Media financed the film and produced alongside London-based management and production company 42. Bliss Media has the Chinese distribution right, while Creative Artists Agency represents the film’s domestic rights. IMR International sold the remaining global rights at the 2016 film industry event American Film Market.

== Reception ==
=== Box office ===
Released in Mainland China on 30 September 2017, the film did not meet expectations, only grossing $2,637,520 over the period. Universal Pictures made a limited release in America on 31 August 2018.

=== Home media ===
It was released on DVD, Blu-ray, Amazon Prime, iTunes Store on 2 October 2018 in North America.
