= Hawaii Five-0 (2010 TV series) season 3 =

Hawaii Five-0
- Season 3
- Season 3 U.S. DVD cover
- Showrunner: Peter M. Lenkov
- Starring: Alex O'Loughlin; Scott Caan; Daniel Dae Kim; Grace Park; Masi Oka; Michelle Borth
- No. of episodes: 24

Release
- Original network: CBS
- Original release: September 24, 2012 – May 20, 2013

Season chronology
- ← Previous; Season 2 Next → Season 4

The third season of the CBS crime drama series Hawaii Five-0 premiered on September 24, 2012 and ended on May 20, 2013.

== Cast and characters ==
Christine Lahti joined the cast in a recurring role as McGarrett's mother, Doris, who had been revealed to actually still be alive at the end of the previous season. "She's a wonderful addition to the 'H50' family and the fans will certainly enjoy what we have in store for her," said showrunner Peter M. Lenkov "Let's just say that the apple doesn't fall far from the tree." Her role lead to a return of McGarrett's girlfriend Catherine, who "shamelessly flirted" with a federal agent to get information about her.

Ed Asner reprised his role as smuggler August March, a villain from the original series who become the first non-main character from it to have a rebooted version on the new series when McGarrett seeks March's help in apprehending some art thieves. In other casting developments, Lenkov revealed on his Twitter feed that Carlos Bernard had joined the show. He declined to identify which role Bernard would play, but did say that the producers hoped he would appear in "many eps". He appeared in two episodes portraying WITSEC Agent Channing. Ving Rhames was cast as a guest star and possibly more. One episode was slated to flash back to Danny's New Jersey police days when he had to deal with Rhames's character, leading to a possible recurring role in the present. However, the episode aired and Rhames did not appear.

=== Main cast ===
- Alex O'Loughlin as Lieutenant Commander Steven "Steve" McGarrett, United States Navy Reserve
- Scott Caan as Detective Sergeant Daniel "Danny" "Danno" Williams
- Daniel Dae Kim as Detective Lieutenant Chin Ho Kelly
- Grace Park as Officer Kono Kalakaua
- Masi Oka as Dr. Max Bergman, Chief Medical Examiner
- Michelle Borth as Lieutenant Catherine Rollins, United States Navy

=== Recurring ===
- Reiko Aylesworth as Dr. Malia Waincroft
- William Baldwin as Frank Delano
- Dennis Chun as HPD Sergeant Duke Lukela
- Mark Dacascos as Wo Fat
- Ian Anthony Dale as Adam Noshimuri
- Daniel Henney as Michael Noshimuri
- Teilor Grubbs as Grace Williams
- Richard T. Jones as Governor Sam Denning
- Christine Lahti as Doris McGarrett
- Will Yun Lee as Sang Min Sooh
- Taryn Manning as Mary Ann McGarret
- Taylor Wily as Kamekona Tupuola
- Brian Yang as Che "Charlie" Fong
- Terry O'Quinn as Commander Joe White, United States Navy
- Justin Bruening as Lieutenant Commander William "Billy" Harrington
- Autumn Reeser as Dr. Gabrielle Asano

=== Notable guest stars ===
- Ed Asner as August March
- Jimmy Buffett as Frank Bama
- Treat Williams as Mick Logan
- C. Thomas Howell as Martin Cordova
- David Keith as Commanding Officer Wade Gutches
- Lochlyn Munro as Jim Rogers
- Sydney Tamiia Poitier as Grace
- Terrence Howard as a gang member
- T.I. as a gang member
- Behati Prinsloo as herself
- Alan Ritchson as Freddie Hart
- Rumer Willis as Sabrina Lane
- Vanessa Marcil as Olivia Victor
- Tom Arnold as Ron Alberts
- Jeff Fahey as Professor
- Jason Scott Lee as Detective Kaleo
- Craig T. Nelson as Tyler Cain
- Daniel Baldwin as Paul Delano
- George Takei as Uncle Choi
- Peter Weller as Curt Stoner
- Summer Glau as Maggie Hoapili
- Aisha Tyler as Savannah Walker
- William Sadler as John McGarrett
- Janel Parrish as Rebecca Fine
- Curtis Bush as Security Guard #3
- Duane Chapman as Dog the Bounty Hunter
- Carlos Bernard as WITSEC Agent Chris Channing

== Episodes ==
No. overall	No. in season	Title	Directed by	Written by	Original release date	Prod. code	U.S. viewers (millions)
48	1	"La O Na Makuahine" "Mother's Day"	Bryan Spicer	Peter M. Lenkov	September 24, 2012	301	8.06
McGarrett reluctantly begins to reconcile with his presumed-dead mother Doris (Christine Lahti), who was revealed to be Shelburne in the previous episode. She admits that she was a spy who murdered Wo Fat's (Mark Dacascos) father, and later faked her death to protect herself. Meanwhile, Kono is pulled from the water by Adam Noshimuri (Ian Anthony Dale), having been alerted by Chin. Chin races back home to save his wife Malia, but she succumbs to her injuries and dies, leaving Chin devastated. Furthermore, Frank Delano (William Baldwin), who arranged those events, also breaks Wo Fat out of prison. Delano asks Wo Fat to help him smuggle drugs out of Hawaii, and in exchange he will give him Shelburne's location. McGarrett returns to Hawaii and places Doris into custody under his girlfriend Catherine Rollins (Michelle Borth). Chin avenges his wife's death by shooting Delano after an intense gun battle, ending with Delano running out of bullets and Chin choosing to kill him anyway. One of Delano's dying men reveals that Wo Fat knows where Doris is. Wo Fat escapes after Doris fires three shots. At the end of the episode, Steve sends his mom away from the island to protect her from Wo Fat, but as her plane departs, Danny shows up and reveals that she fired the three shots into the ground, making Steve wonder why she apparently let Wo Fat escape. Note: This is the first episode to feature Michelle Borth as a main cast member
49	2	"Kanalua" "Doubt"	Frederick E. O. Toye	Joe Halpin	October 1, 2012	302	7.95
Following an elaborate art heist, the Five-0 team finds the getaway car along with the driver who was shot in the head before he and the car were set on fire. The driver is identified as a former NASCAR driver, who was forced to work for the thieves after they kidnapped his daughter. The team calls on August March (Ed Asner) for help in tracking the daughter. Meanwhile, Steve asks Catherine for assistance in tracking his mother. She finds that Doris is hiding somewhere on the island. Meanwhile, the team tries to help Chin cope with the death of his wife.
50	3	"Lana I Ka Moana" "Adrift"	Steve Boyum	Elwood Reid	October 8, 2012	303	8.39
McGarrett and Danny are fishing in the ocean when they rescue a man (Todd Stashwick) lost at sea on a raft. However, the man pulls out a gun and hijacks the boat while also stranding McGarrett and Danny at sea. The two find a disabled yacht, and come across a dead body, shot by the same weapon used by the hijacker.
51	4	"Popilikia" "Misfortune"	Christine Moore	Stephanie Sengupta	October 15, 2012	304	8.70
Professional polo player Billy Keats (Robbie Amell) is found decapitated by a garroting wire tied between two poles while he was playing. One of his friends, Jake Madsen (Guy Wilson), reveals to Five-0 that he believes Jake was the intended target. It is further revealed that Jake was kidnapped ten years ago, but escaped before a ransom was paid. Meanwhile, Doris reunites with McGarrett. Doris claims the reason why she shot at the floor was due to a struggle between her and Wo Fat, however McGarrett reveals to Danny that he does not believe her. Doris meanwhile, secretly recovers a microfiche from a cavity under McGarrett's home.
52	5	"Mohai" "Offering"	Jerry Levine	Story by : Peter M. Lenkov & David Wolkove; Teleplay by : David Wolkove	November 5, 2012	307	7.53
On Halloween night, Five-0 investigates a road accident where the drivers of both vehicles are missing. One of the drivers is later found murdered, having died as a ritualistic sacrifice, most likely by the other driver. The team learn that Lisa Heller, one of the victims, was at a party in a condemned house and find the killer took another victim, Lucas Hayes (Jordan Matlock), to murder him in a similar ritual by the following night.
53	6	"I Ka Wa Mamua" "In a Time Past"	Sylvain White	Story by : Peter M. Lenkov; Teleplay by : Ken Solarz	November 12, 2012	305	7.96
The team investigate an explosion where they find traces of acetone peroxide, which are used by Middle Eastern terrorists, indicating a terrorist cell is active in Hawaii. A discovery of the terrorist hideout leads Five-0 to a planned attack at a military base where the Secretary of Defense is speaking at an event. Five-0 and HPD manage to secure the area, locate and disarm the bomb, but the terrorist responsible has escaped. Danny ultimately finds the man and shoots him, but finds the terrorist was strapped with a bomb with a proximity sensor, and Danny has to stay still or the vest would explode. As the bomb squad works to defuse the device, McGarrett distracts Danny from his anxiety by asking him to tell the story of how he escaped death in New Jersey. Danny recalls the incident on September 11, 2001, before the attacks, when he and his then partner (Sydney Tamiia Poitier), are captured by gang members (T.I. and Terrence Howard) in their drug operation. At the time Danny's wife was pregnant, and it's implied Danny named their daughter after his partner: Grace Tilwell.
54	7	"Ohuna" "The Secret"	Larry Teng	Mike Schaub	November 19, 2012	306	9.02
Zach Slater (Matt Bush), a teenage boy and expert computer hacker, is released from juvenile hall but is abducted shortly after and later found dead. Five-0 realize he had files in his hard drive, which was what the killers were after. After Kono discovers Zach's password in his room, the killers, led by South African mercenary Sean Winston (Carlo Rota), storm the house and hold everybody hostage. Meanwhile, Mary Ann McGarret (Taryn Manning) returns for a visit. She's now a caregiver and brings her patient, Morty Sapperstein (Shelley Berman), in tow but is unrelenting in not wanting to see her mother. Her companion however convinces her to see Doris, reciting his story when his estranged daughter was killed years before.
55	8	"Wahineʻinoloa" "Evil Woman"	Steve Boyum	Story by : Stephanie Sengupta & Courtney Kemp Agboh; Teleplay by : Stephanie Sengupta	November 26, 2012	308	10.30
Following the murder of Aiden O'Connell in a sugar cane field in Maui, McGarrett is convinced that Olivia Victor (Vanessa Marcil), Aiden's psychologist, is responsible, but her initial arrest is overturned due to lack of evidence. To hinder the investigation, Victor files a restraining order against McGarrett. Meanwhile, Catherine is confronted by WITSEC Agent Channing (Carlos Bernard), now suspended, after Catherine hacked into his account to get information on Doris's whereabouts. They learn that one of her assassination targets, "Mangosta", is still alive and seeking revenge in Hawaii. Doris captures Mangosta and tortures him for information on who else knows she is alive, before Catherine stops her.
56	9	"Haʻawe Make Loa" "Death Wish"	Gwyneth Horder-Payton	Bill Haynes	December 3, 2012	311	9.32
Five-0 investigate a bank robbery where two people are shot, with one of those being a teller (Rumer Willis), a witness that Max was going to ask out. The other, Jim Rogers (Lochlyn Munro), later dies in hospital after one of the robbers returns to silence him. After identifying the leader, mob enforcer Martin Cordova (C. Thomas Howell), the team realizes that Rodgers paid Cordova to rob the bank and attempt a kidnapping so that he can die a hero in order to win the trust of his family. Cordova kidnaps McGarrett, sends him to a remote area and goads McGarrett into killing him, not wishing to die from the cancer. Meanwhile, Danny has to catch a stalker who sent a threatening letter to one of Victoria's Secret's models. The stalker is later identified as Denise Pope (Z. Zoccolante), and Danny kills her before she could murder her target.
57	10	"Huakaʻi Kula" "Field Trip"	Eric Laneuville	Michele Fazekas & Tara Butters	December 10, 2012	309	9.84
McGarrett and Danny accompany Grace's Aloha Girl Scout troop on a camping trip but stumble upon an injured hiker Ron Alberts (Tom Arnold), who shoots Danny and locks him and the girls in a bunker. He takes McGarrett and one of the girls hostage to find something he lost in the jungle- a bag of diamonds he dumped from a plane which crashed. Meanwhile, Kono meets Adam Noshimuri's brother, Michael (Daniel Henney), recently released from prison after serving 10 years for manslaughter, who is less than thrilled with Adam's plans of transforming the Yakuza. In the end of the episode, Michael is revealed to have used Kono's gun while she is sleeping.
58	11	"Kahu" "Guardian"	Bryan Spicer	Noah Nelson	December 17, 2012	312	10.54
Christmas time in Hawaii finds McGarrett and Catherine helping teenager Ethan Awana (Tristan Lake Leabu) find his missing father, after blood is found in the general store he owns. It is later revealed the blood does not belong to the father, but a shooter he was defending himself from. Meanwhile, Kamekona enlists Danny's help in buying a helicopter for his new air tour company.
59	12	"Kapu" "Forbidden"	Steven DePaul	David Wolkove	January 14, 2013	313	9.59
A university chemistry professor is found dead in an acid bath. The team have a suspect range of 300 people who have access to the labs and equipment. Five-0 later discover that the professor missed lectures in order to pursue other projects, namely bringing back an extinct plant which can hold the key to curing a disease. Meanwhile, Kono is placed in charge of guarding Sang Min, who has returned to Hawaii to testify in a federal case. Sang Min escapes custody to see his family. Kono arranges to have Sang Min transferred back to Halawa prison to be close to them. Danny is saddled with looking after his nephew Eric (Andrew Lawrence), who has recently arrived on the island, who later ends up assisting Five-0 in the case. In the end of the episode, Eric wants to work in the crime lab.
60	13	"Olelo HoʻOpaʻI Make" "Death Sentence"	Bryan Spicer	Steve Cwik	January 20, 2013	314	13.03
Chin is drugged and abducted, later waking up behind bars at the Halawa Correctional Facility. He asks a guard for assistance only to find out said guard is in on the conspiracy, and taken to corrupt and imprisoned detective Kaleo (Jason Scott Lee). Sang Min intervenes to help Chin, and both decide to attempt an escape. Five-0, at first believing he is taking time off to cope with Malia's death, become suspicious when he misses his appointment with a psychiatrist. They find that Chin was kidnapped by Paul Delano (Daniel Baldwin), Frank Delano's brother who is targeting Chin to avenge Frank's death (in "La O Na Makuahine"). Sang Min takes the opportunity to escape by posing as a guard. Kono contemplates snooping into Adam's Yakuza affairs and eventually manages to clone his cell phone.
61	14	"Hana I WaʻIa" "Scandal"	Larry Teng	Mike Schaub	January 21, 2013	310	9.85
At the request of Governor Denning, Five-0 discreetly investigate the murder of a prostitute. However, the team later find that Denning is attempting to impede the investigation. McGarrett confronts the Governor, who reveals that the prostitute may have slept with Chris Freed (Wiley Pickett), a Congressman running to become a Senator. At first suspecting him of the murder, the team later realize that Freed has been kidnapped by Wo Fat, who is forcing him to sign a document. Meanwhile, Danny attends a custody hearing in court regarding Grace. At one point, McGarrett speaks in defense of Danny, even though it is unorthodox. The Judge eventually rules in Danny's favor and he is to get shared custody of Grace.
62	15	"Hookman"	Peter Weller	Story by : Glen Olson & Rod Baker; Teleplay by : Joe Halpin	February 4, 2013	315	9.86
Police officer Ben Keoki, a friend of McGarrett's father, is assassinated and a shell casing with his name engraved on it is left behind at the scene. During the raid for the suspect, another officer, Troy Ookala, another friend of McGarret senior, is assassinated. The assassin (Peter Weller) then lures McGarrett to a gun shop. McGarrett and Danny chase him, ending on the assassin's car landing in the ocean, but he escapes. When McGarrett spots a prosthetic hand left over, he realizes that the man they are after is Curt Stoner. He was arrested twenty years ago for armed robbery by the same officers he is targeting, and his hands were blown away during his arrest and is now seeking to avenge himself by killing those responsible including Duke Lukela (Dennis Chun).
63	16	"Kekoa" "Warrior"	Larry Teng	Al Septien & Turi Meyer	February 11, 2013	316	9.64
Kamekona's cousin is found shot to death in the trunk of a car. Danny and McGarrett follow Kamekona, who they believe is trying to avenge the man he thinks is responsible, although it is later revealed that Kamekona's target was not involved in the murder. Video evidence shows the victim being kidnapped beforehand, and between his kidnap and murder, he unwillingly competed in an underground fight-club. The fights were held by mixed martial artist Ramsey Pollack (Keith Jardine), wanted in connection to similar murders. Meanwhile, McGarrett hires Mick Logan (Treat Williams), a private investigator to keep tabs on his mother's whereabouts, which eventually leads the two to start a relationship after Doris knows he was hired by her son.
64	17	"Paʻani" "The Game"	Jeffrey Hunt	Kyle Harimoto & David Wolkove	February 18, 2013	317	9.11
As the island prepares itself for the Pro Bowl, an executive from a California technology company is found dead after a tactical ops team building exercise. Max finds the victim was sedated the night before, and the team trace it back to a bar, where a bar man reveals that he and a female accomplice, "Holly" (Rebekah Steen), marked the victim to steal his money. Five-0 track to her to a hotel, where it is discovered that she is assisted by running back Arian Foster from one of her other accomplices, Timothy Cross (Matt Bushell), who matches the build of the killer. Cross reveals he was hired to steal the data from the victim's laptop which contains a potential invention to a new piece of software.
65	18	"Na Kiʻi" "Dolls"	Duane Clark	Story by : Michael Reisz; Teleplay by : Stephanie Sengupta	March 18, 2013	318	8.99
While apprehending his latest fugitive, Dog the Bounty Hunter is witness to a woman falling off a balcony to her death. Max finds evidence that she was drugged a few hours before her death. Five-0 also discovers that the victim led a double life as a roller derby player. Unable to get any useful information about the victim from her teammates, McGarrett orders Catherine to go undercover as the team's jammer. Catherine finds that one of her teammates wanted the victim dead, and hacks into the coach's computer to get a roster. Meanwhile, a masked man steals a safe from Doris. She eventually admits to McGarrett that the safe contains a microfiche with all her CIA assignments unredacted, and that "Mangosta" is involved.
66	19	"Hoa Pili" "Close Friend"	Jeff Cadiente	Story by : Richard Arthur & Kyle Harimoto; Teleplay by : Kyle Harimoto	March 25, 2013	319	8.61
The team investigate the latest of a series of arson and bombing attacks to Oahu Shark Tours, and later discover the owner's brother dead in a submerged shark cage. Five-0 first suspects the Kapu to be involved, only to find Kawika's (Kala Alexander) home on fire. Kawika assures McGarrett that he was not involved in the attacks, but another member admits to beating the victim for bringing the sharks closer to the shore, but did not kill him. Eventually, Five-0 discover that the shark tours were targeted because some of the employees discovered a drum of MDMA tablets owned by a drug cartel. Meanwhile, Kamekona passes his helicopter pilot's licence. Leilani, the prison nurse Chin helped in "Olelo HoʻOpaʻI Make", pays him a visit.
67	20	"Olelo Paʻa" "The Promise"	Joe Dante	Peter M. Lenkov & Ken Solarz	April 15, 2013	320	7.65
Before the events of the episode, flashbacks show McGarrett training with Freddie Hart (Alan Ritchson), who considers giving up, until McGarrett convinces him to stay, Freddie ends up becoming a better SEAL. In September 2010, before the events of the pilot, McGarrett and Hart are on a top secret mission to North Korea to capture Anton Hesse, who is under the protection of a militia owned by Han Ji-Woon (Rick Yune). However, Freddie is mortally wounded in the process. In the present, McGarrett and Catherine enter the Korean Demilitarized Zone to bring his body back to the US, however the body they found is not Freddie's. The couple sneak into North Korea to find the real body. McGarrett and Catherine later return to the U.S. with the remains where at the cemetery, Freddie's family along with members of the Navy SEALS including Joe White are seen. Freddie is given a proper military funeral and buried at last, with Steve relieved to see that Chin, Danny and Kono are at the funeral albeit at a small distance.
68	21	"Imi Loko Ka ʻUhane" "Seek Within One's Soul"	Bryan Spicer	Bill Haynes	April 29, 2013	321	7.76
Five-0's case of a mutilated corpse is overshadowed by Savannah Walker (Aisha Tyler), a daytime talk show host who is profiling the unit on her series. While Five-0 investigate, Walker inadvertently walks into Wo Fat, disguised as a patrol officer. After Wo Fat escapes, the team later conclude he did not murder the victim. It is later revealed that the victim, Roger Carson, worked in the Bureau of Engraving and Printing and had a tattoo with a map on it. Ater replicating the map and deducing that the girlfriend's brother was responsible, the team rush to the same place on the map to find the murderer dead. Wo Fat attempts to escape by helicopter, only for Five-0 to shoot it down. Wo Fat is arrested, although he sustains severe burns on one side of his face from the crash.
69	22	"Hoʻopio" "To Take Captive"	Steve Boyum	Story by : Peter M. Lenkov; Teleplay by : Noah Nelson	May 6, 2013	322	8.01
After having been missing for 10 years, 17-year-old Amanda Morris is found dead, shot in the back in a shallow grave. The investigation of her body reveals traces of 6-year-old girl Ella Bishop, who was recently reported kidnapped. The team later identify the kidnapper, Helen Cantera, who shoots herself rather than allow herself to get arrested and reveal Ella's location. Kidnappers Ray and Terry Beckett were portrayed by Henry Rollins and Mare Winningham. Meanwhile, with Adam in Osaka, Kono discovers that he is out to meet with "Sato", who through Catherine's assistance, is revealed to be one of the leading members of the Yakuza.
70	23	"He Welo ʻOihana" "Family Business"	Larry Teng	Eric Guggenheim	May 13, 2013	323	7.86
A security guard chases away trespassers at a to-be construction site, only to fall in a hole and then get executed. Later it is revealed that the site has several dead bodies buried underground, where the victims are discovered to be targets of the Yakuza. Kono confronts Adam about the site and Sato. Adam claims he met with Sato to leave the Yakuza, and has no knowledge of the site, though he suspects Michael may be behind it. Kono later traces one of Adam's outgoing to calls to a warehouse the Yakuza have been operating. She comes across two gunmen, who she takes down, but is shot herself in the process. Meanwhile, McGarrett discovers that Doris is planning to take back the stolen microfiche, which is in possession of Tyler Cain (Craig T. Nelson), an ex-CIA agent. He decides to join her in the operation, only to be caught and held hostage in the process. Cain offers a trade, Doris for the microfiche, but McGarrett responds by burning the film. When they are both released, McGarrett reveals that he burnt a fake microfiche, and has retrieved the real one. In the end of the episode, Max finds a ballistics match to Kono's weapon on several of the murders and informs Steve and Danny of this with the news leaving both men stunned.
71	24	"Aloha, Malama Pono" "Farewell and Take Care"	Bryan Spicer	Peter M. Lenkov & Ken Solarz & David Wolkove	May 20, 2013	324	9.00
Five bodies are found aboard a plane that was transporting Rafael Selgado (Michael Irby), a terrorist from the organization NLM, who is missing. His son is also missing, although when Five-0 eventually catch Selgado, he reveals that his son was kidnapped to prevent him from co-operating with the authorities to reveal the location of a planned terrorist attack in San Francisco. In order to learn the target, Five-0 must rescue his son. During an exchange of his son, Five-0 intercept. Selgado is mortally wounded in the process, but reveals the target's location before he dies. As this transpires, Kono is wanted by the police for the murders, and hides in Adam's house until she can clear her name. Michael, who was framing her, finds Adam and Kono and attempts to kill his brother, but Adam kills Michael after a struggle over the gun instead. Although Kono is later cleared, Chin reveals that the Yakuza wants Adam dead for trying to leave, and he and Kono decide to leave Hawaii until the opponents are stopped. McGarrett learns that his mother paid a visit to Wo Fat. McGarrett visits the detention center to see Wo Fat, only to find it being under attack. Wo Fat wants McGarrett to save his life in exchange for revealing why Doris visited him.

== Production ==
On March 14, 2012, CBS renewed Hawaii-Five-0 for a third season. Filming began on July 9, 2012, with a traditional Hawaiian blessing. The season premiered on September 24, 2012. The season premiere aired one day earlier in Hawaii on Waikīkī Beach. In the UK the third season of Hawaii-Five-0 airs as part of Sky 1 Sundays at 9pm and is followed by crossover show NCIS: Los Angeles. Broadcast began on January 6, 2013 for both.

Online voting by viewers determined the ending of the January 14, 2013 episode "Kapu" ("Forbidden"), with two zones, Eastern and Central Time Zones, and Mountain and Pacific Time Zones, each getting their own result. Each alternate ending could be seen online after the episode aired.

The episode "Hookman" was inspired by the episode of the same title from the original series. Locations from the original episode were used in the new one. Peter Weller directed the episode and played the amputee, though Jason Kroger, a double amputee, stood in for Weller for closeups of his hands. The episode credits (although not the end titles) were done in the style of the original series, including having the episode title be shown on screen.

== Reception ==
=== Ratings ===
№	Episode	Air date	18-49 rating	Viewers (millions)	Weekly rank	Live+7 18-49	Live+7 viewers (millions)
1	"La O Na Makuahine"	September 24, 2012	1.8	8.06	N/A	2.9	11.38
2	"Kanalua"	October 1, 2012	2.0	7.95	N/A	2.9	11.16
3	"Lana I Ka Moana"	October 8, 2012	1.9	8.39	N/A	2.8	11.48
4	"Popilikia"	October 15, 2012	2.1	8.70	N/A	3.0	11.73
5	"Mohai"	November 5, 2012	2.0	7.53	N/A	N/A	10.08
6	"I Ka Wa Mamua"	November 12, 2012	2.1	7.96	N/A	3.1	11.36
7	"Ohuna"	November 19, 2012	2.2	9.02	#24	3.1	12.24
8	"Wahineʻinoloa"	November 26, 2012	2.3	10.30	#21	3.2	13.59
9	"Haʻawe Make Loa"	December 3, 2012	2.3	9.32	#21	3.2	12.92
10	"Huakaʻi Kula"	December 10, 2012	2.5	9.84	#19	3.3	12.65
11	"Kahu"	December 17, 2012	2.4	10.54	#9	3.3	13.54
12	"Kapu"	January 14, 2013	2.4	9.59	#19	3.4	13.19
13	"Olelo HoʻOpaʻI Make"	January 20, 2013	3.5	13.03	#7	N/A	N/A
14	"Hana I WaʻIa"	January 21, 2013	2.3	9.85	#18	3.1	13.02
15	"Hookman"	February 4, 2013	2.3	9.86	#18	3.2	13.27
16	"Kekoa"	February 11, 2013	2.1	9.64	#12	3.1	13.28
17	"Paʻani"	February 18, 2013	2.0	9.11	#24	3.0	12.59
18	"Na Kiʻi"	March 18, 2013	2.1	8.99	#17	3.0	12.22
19	"Hoa Pili"	March 25, 2013	2.1	8.61	#19	3.0	11.87
20	"Olelo Pa'a"	April 15, 2013	1.8	7.65	#24	2.6	10.56
21	"Imi Loko Ka 'Uhane"	April 29, 2013	1.7	7.76	N/A	2.6	10.57
22	"Ho'opio"	May 6, 2013	1.9	8.01	N/A	2.7	10.99
23	"He Welo Oihana"	May 13, 2013	1.8	7.86	#25	2.6	10.83
24	"Aloha Malama Ponto"	May 20, 2013	2.0	9.00	#8	2.8	12.10

== Home video release ==
Hawaii Five-0: The Third Season
Set details			Special features
24 episodes; 7-disc set; 1.78:1 aspect ratio; Languages: English (Dolby Digital 5.1, with subtitles); Subtitles in English, Spanish, and Portuguese; Audio commentaries on "Hookman" and "Pa'ani"			Shore Lines: Season 3; Aloha Action! Season 3; Script To Screen (The Evolution Of An Episode); Hawaii Five-Over The Whole Wide World (A Global Phenomenon); Hookman (Episode from Original Series); Deleted Scenes; Gag Reel
Release Dates			Shore Lines: Season 3; Aloha Action! Season 3; Script To Screen (The Evolution Of An Episode); Hawaii Five-Over The Whole Wide World (A Global Phenomenon); Hookman (Episode from Original Series); Deleted Scenes; Gag Reel
Region 1	Region 2	Region 4	Shore Lines: Season 3; Aloha Action! Season 3; Script To Screen (The Evolution Of An Episode); Hawaii Five-Over The Whole Wide World (A Global Phenomenon); Hookman (Episode from Original Series); Deleted Scenes; Gag Reel
September 24, 2013	September 30, 2013	Unknown	Shore Lines: Season 3; Aloha Action! Season 3; Script To Screen (The Evolution Of An Episode); Hawaii Five-Over The Whole Wide World (A Global Phenomenon); Hookman (Episode from Original Series); Deleted Scenes; Gag Reel
