= Zhao Jinmai =

Chinese actress (born 2002)

- 赵今麦
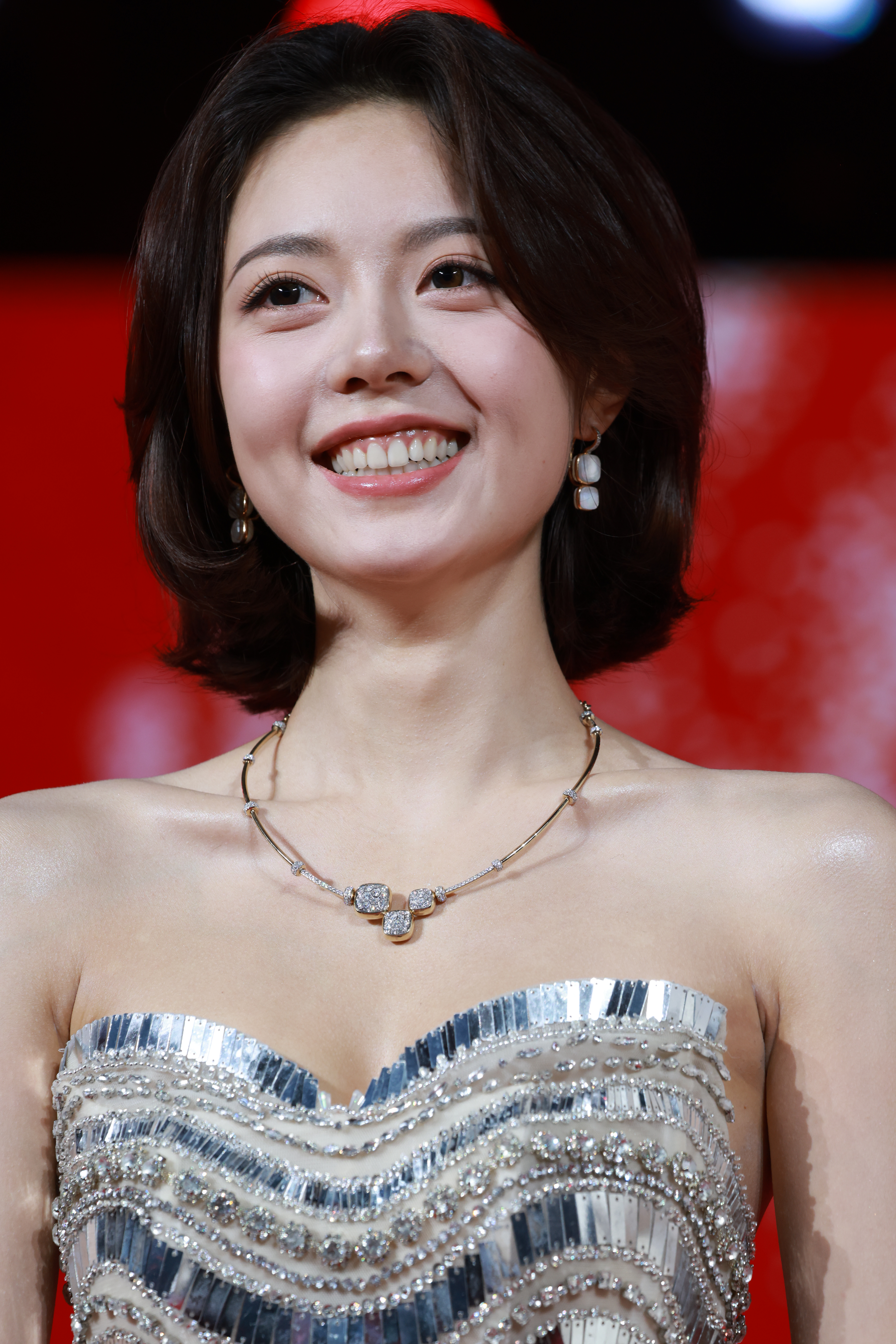
- Zhao Jinmai in 2026
- Born: 29 September 2002 (age 24); Shenyang, Liaoning, China
- Other name: Angel Zhao
- Education: Central Academy of Drama
- Occupations: Actress; Model
- Years active: 2010–present
- Notable work: Film: The Wandering Earth; TV series: Reset; The Princess Royal; Drifting Away; Shine On Me

Chinese name
- Simplified Chinese: 赵今麦
- Traditional Chinese: 趙今麥
Transcriptions
Standard Mandarin
- Hanyu Pinyin: Zhào Jīnmài

Zhao Jinmai (Chinese: 赵今麦; born 29 September 2002) is a Chinese actress. She is known for her role in the films Balala the Fairies franchise, and The Wandering Earth; in the series Growing Pain, A Little Thing Called First Love, Reset, The Princess Royal, Amidst a Snowstorm of Love, Drifting Away and Shine on Me. In 2019, Forbes China listed Zhao under "30 Under 30 Asia" category, for her professional contributions.

== Early life ==
Zhao was born in Shenyang, Liaoning, China on 29 September 2002. Her father is a chemistry faculty head. She attended high school in Shenyang, maintaining strong grades while working as a child actress. In 2020, she was admitted to the Central Academy of Drama, from which she graduated in 2024.

== Career ==
=== 2010–2018: Beginning ===
In 2010, Zhao started her acting career as a child actress. She appeared in several television series and films, including the fantasy children's film Balala the Fairies. In 2016, she appeared in the urban family drama A Love for Separation, which gained popularity and increased her recognition. In 2017, she starred in the modern drama My! Physical Education Teacher; and in 2018, in the comedy film Go Brother! adapted from Chinese manhua Please Take My Brother Away!.

=== 2019–2021: Breakthrough ===
In 2019, Zhao starred as "Han Duoduo", the lead female role in the sci-fi film The Wandering Earth, adapted from Liu Cixin's novel, one of China's highest-grossing films that brought her wider recognition. She further gained recognition in the family drama Growing Pain. She as lead starred in the romance drama A Little Thing Called First Love.

=== 2022–present: Rising popularity ===
In 2022, Zhao starred as "Li Shiqing" in Reset, a time loop series. It exceeded 1.8B views, and achieved 30,000 popularity index on Tencent Video. This made her one the most recognizable actress in China. In 2024, her historical series The Princess Royal and the sports romantic drama Amidst a Snowstorm of Love were commercially successful. In 2025, her crime suspense drama Drifting Away was critically acclaimed, and exceeded 10,000 popularity index on iQIYI. She also starred in romantic series Shine on Me. It exceeded 1B views on Tencent Video, and achieved 30,000 popularity index.

== Filmography ==
=== Films ===
Year	English title	Role	Notes/Ref.
2014	Balala the Fairies: The Magic Trial	Ling Meiqi (Maggie)	
2015	Balala the Fairies: Princess Camellia	Ling Meiqi (Maggie)	
2018	Go Brother!	Miao Miaomiao	
2019	The Wandering Earth	Han Duoduo	
2019	A Sedan	Li Li	Filmed in 2015
2022	One Week Friends	Lin Xiangzhi	
2022	Ode to the Spring	Xiao Mai	
2027	The Wandering Earth 3 - Phase 1	Han Duoduo	
2028	The Wandering Earth 3 - Phase 2	Han Duoduo	
TBA	Again and Again	Meng Xinyue	Damai Pictures (filmed in 2026)
TBA	The Beginning: The Undeliverable Courier	Li Shiqing (cameo)	Filmed in 2026

=== Television / web series ===
Year	English title	Role	Notes/Ref.
2012	Cannot No Mother	Xiang Di	
2013	When the Heart Meets the Benevolence	Xiao Sanya	
2015	Balala the Fairies: The Riddle of the Notes	Ling Meiqi (Maggie)	
2016	A Love for Separation	Jin Qinqin	
2017	My! Physical Education Teacher	Mary	
2017	Love is the Source of Joy	Zhang Tong	
2019	Growing Pain	Lin Miaomiao	
2019	A Little Thing Called First Love	Xia Miaomiao	
2020	Reborn	Chen Rui	
2020	With You	Rong Yi	
2021	The Blessed Girl	Huotu Linglong	
2021	Brilliant Girls	Wen Xiaoyang	
2022	Reset	Li Shiqing	
2022	Growing Pain; Season 2	Lin Miaomiao	
2023	Stand by Me	Luo Qiqi	
2024	Amidst a Snowstorm of Love	Yin Guo	
2024	The Princess Royal	Li Rong	
2025	Drifting Away	Zhen Zhen	
2025	Our Generation	Lin Qile	
2025	Shine on Me	Nie Xiguang	
2026	Irreplaceable	Xu Chi	
TBA	A Journey to Glow	Chu Tingyu	

=== Variety shows ===
Year	English title	Role	Notes/Ref.
2019	Four Try	Cast member	
2022	Divas Hit the Road; Season 4	Cast member	

== Awards and nominations ==
Year	Award	Category	Nominated work	Results	Ref.
2018	Guangzhou College Student Film Festival — Students' Choice Award	Favorite Supporting Actress	Go Brother!	Nominated	
2019	4th Golden Blossom Internet Film and Television Awards	Best Newcomer	Growing Pain; A Little Thing Called First Love	Nominated	
2019	China TV Drama Awards	New Generation of Youth Performer	Growing Pain	Won	
2019	1st China Film Critics Association Awards	New Performer of the Year	The Wandering Earth	Nominated	
2020	7th The Actors of China Awards	Best Actress (Green Group)	—N/a	Nominated	
2021	3rd Asian Contents Awards	Best Newcomer Actress	The Blessed Girl	Nominated	
2022	35th Huading Awards	Best Actress in Chinese Modern Dramas	Reset	Nominated	
2023	1st "New Horns" Drama Director's Night	Breakthrough Actress of the Year	Reset	Won	
2023	Baidu Boiling Point Metaverse Night	Boiling Point Breakthrough Actress	—N/a	Won	
2024	Television Series of China Quality Ceremony	Female Drama Star with Full Media Attention of the Year	Amidst a Snowstorm of Love	Won	
2025	IQIYI Scream Night Awards	Audience's Favourite Actress	Drifting Away	Won	
