= Wang Bowen =

- 王博文
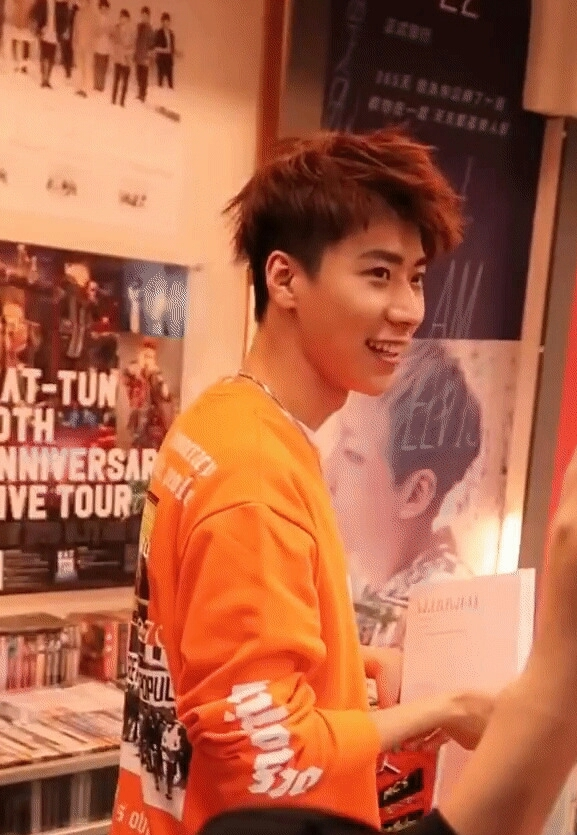
- Wang Bowen in October 2016
- Born: May 18, 1994 (age 31)
- Other names: Gou Ge "Dog Brother"; Xiao Bai "Little White".
- Occupations: Singer; model; actor; television personality
- Height: 183 cm (6 ft 0 in)
- Musical career
- Genres: Mandopop; Pop; Ballad
- Instrument: Vocals
- Years active: 2013–present
- Label: 电童文化 (Power Tong Culture)
- Website: weibo.com/wangbowen518

Wang Bowen is a Chinese singer, actor and professional table tennis player.

== Career ==
Wang Bowen is as a pop singer, film and television actor, and national-level table tennis player.

In 2010, Wang joined the Hunan TV "Happy Boys"., debuted in 2014, starred in the movie "my 23-year-old".

In September 2016, Wang Bowen launched a new EP, a big movie earlier in the network.

== Education ==
Bachelor of Journalism Department of Jilin University.

== Filmography ==
=== Film ===
Year	Title	Role	Notes
2014	加油，彩色梦 (Come on, colorful dream)		Main role
2014	轻羽青春 (Feather of youth)	Chen Shaoyang	Main role
2016	Irresistible Love	Shu Nian	Main role
2016	Irresistible Love 2	Shu Nian	Main role
2016	恋恋有声 (Love Song)	Wang Xiaobai	Secondary role

=== Short film ===
Year	Title	Role	Notes
2014	我的23岁	Xia Gang	

=== Web dramas ===
Year	Title	Role	Notes
2016	器灵第一季 (Weapon & Soul)	Bai Tian Luo	
2017	青春最好时 (When we were young)	Li Bai	
2019	A Little Thing Called First Love	Wang Yichao	
