= Hunan Television =

- Hunan Television logo
- Country: China
- Broadcast area: China, Macau, Hong Kong, Taiwan
- Network: Hunan Broadcasting System (HBS)
- Headquarters: Changsha

Programming
- Language: Mandarin
- Picture format: SDTV 576i/480p (1970.9.29–2016.8.31); HDTV 1080i (2009.9.28–present); UHDTV 2160p (2025.9.28–present)

Ownership
- Owner: Hunan Broadcasting System

History
- Launched: 29 September 1970; 56 years ago

Links
- Website: Official website

Hunan Television (Chinese: 湖南卫视; pinyin: Húnán Wèishì) is a Chinese provincial satellite television station based in Changsha, Hunan province. Launched on September 29, 1970 and often nicknamed the "mango channel" (Chinese: 芒果台, due to the station's current logo), it is currently China's second-most-watched television channel, second to China Central Television's CCTV-1, although Hunan TV has occasionally overtaken CCTV-1 in ratings.

Owned by Hunan Broadcasting System, Hunan TV's signal covers most of China, including Macau, Hong Kong, and Taiwan. It is also broadcast overseas as Hunan STV World in Japan, India, Nepal, South Korea, Southeast Asia, Tajikistan, Papua New Guinea, New Zealand, Fiji, Australia, and parts of Africa, the Americas, and Europe. The channel has broadcast in high-definition since September 28, 2009. The appearance of its logo has resulted in the nickname of Mango TV.

== History ==
On December 15, 2006, Hunan TV collaborated with BBC to broadcast "Just the Two of Us"—the first entertainment collaboration between Chinese television and the BBC on a global scale.

On May 20, 2009, Hunan TV World launched in Hong Kong. It was the first permitted "international channel." Aria Jin served as the host of "Shoot, Brother!"

In 2015, because of changes to the State Administration of Press, Publication, Radio, Film and Television's policies, HSTV changed prime-time broadcasts to show 2 episodes per night instead of 3 and changed the start of air time from 19:30 to 20:00. It is the only channel besides CCTV that airs drama at 22:00.

== Reception ==
By 2013, HSTV had broadcast to over 1 billion viewers in China, with 358 million showing approval for HSTV programming. There are approximately 210 million daily viewers. Online, HSTV's platform has 730 million views.

== Notable programs ==
- Happy Camp
- Super Girl
- Super Boy
- Where Are We Going, Dad?
- I Am a Singer
- Super-Vocal
- Day Day Up
- Come Sing with Me
- 72 Floors of Mystery
- Chinese Restaurant
- Takes a Real Man
- Back to Field
