= RoboCop (disambiguation) =

RoboCop is a 1987 American cyberpunk action film.

Robocop or RoboCop may also refer to:

== Media ==
- RoboCop (franchise), an American superhero cyberpunk media franchise
  - RoboCop (character), a fictional robotically enhanced Detroit police officer
  - RoboCop (2014 film), an American cyberpunk superhero action film and a remake of the 1987 film
  - RoboCop (1988 TV series), an animated television series
  - RoboCop (1994 TV series), a live-action television series
  - RoboCop (1988 video game), a beat 'em up/run and gun arcade game
  - RoboCop (2003 video game), a first-person shooter video game based on the RoboCop films
  - RoboCop (comics), a number of comic book series spun off from the feature film of the same name
- "RoboCop" (song), a song by American hip hop artist Kanye West
- Robo Cop, a fictional character from the 2018 Korean film Are You Human?

== People ==
- Ray Mallon (born 1955), British politician
- Charles Robert "Gobotron" McDowell, American musician
- Ulf Samuelsson (born 1964), retired Swedish-American ice hockey defenceman
- Gregory Rodrigues (born 1992), Brazilian mixed martial artist

== Other ==
- RoboCop statue, a crowdfunded bronze statue of the film character in Detroit, Michigan, US

== See also ==
- "Robot Cop" (TV episode), an episode of Pleasant Goat and Big Big Wolf; see List of Pleasant Goat and Big Big Wolf episodes
- Bomb disposal robot, a type of police robot
