= Omni Consumer Products =

Omni Consumer Products may refer to:

- Omni Consumer Products (RoboCop), a fictional corporation in the RoboCop franchise
- Omni Consumer Products (company), a company that manufactures products based on fictional products in film and television
