= ED-209 =

Fictional robot in the RoboCop franchise

- RoboCop character
- ED-209 in the first film.
- First appearance: RoboCop
- Created by: Ed Neumeier; Michael Miner
- Voiced by: Jon Davison; Jimmy Chimarios; Allen Stewart-Coates (ED-260)

In-universe information
- Gender: N/A (Male vocals)
- Manufacturer: Omni Consumer Products

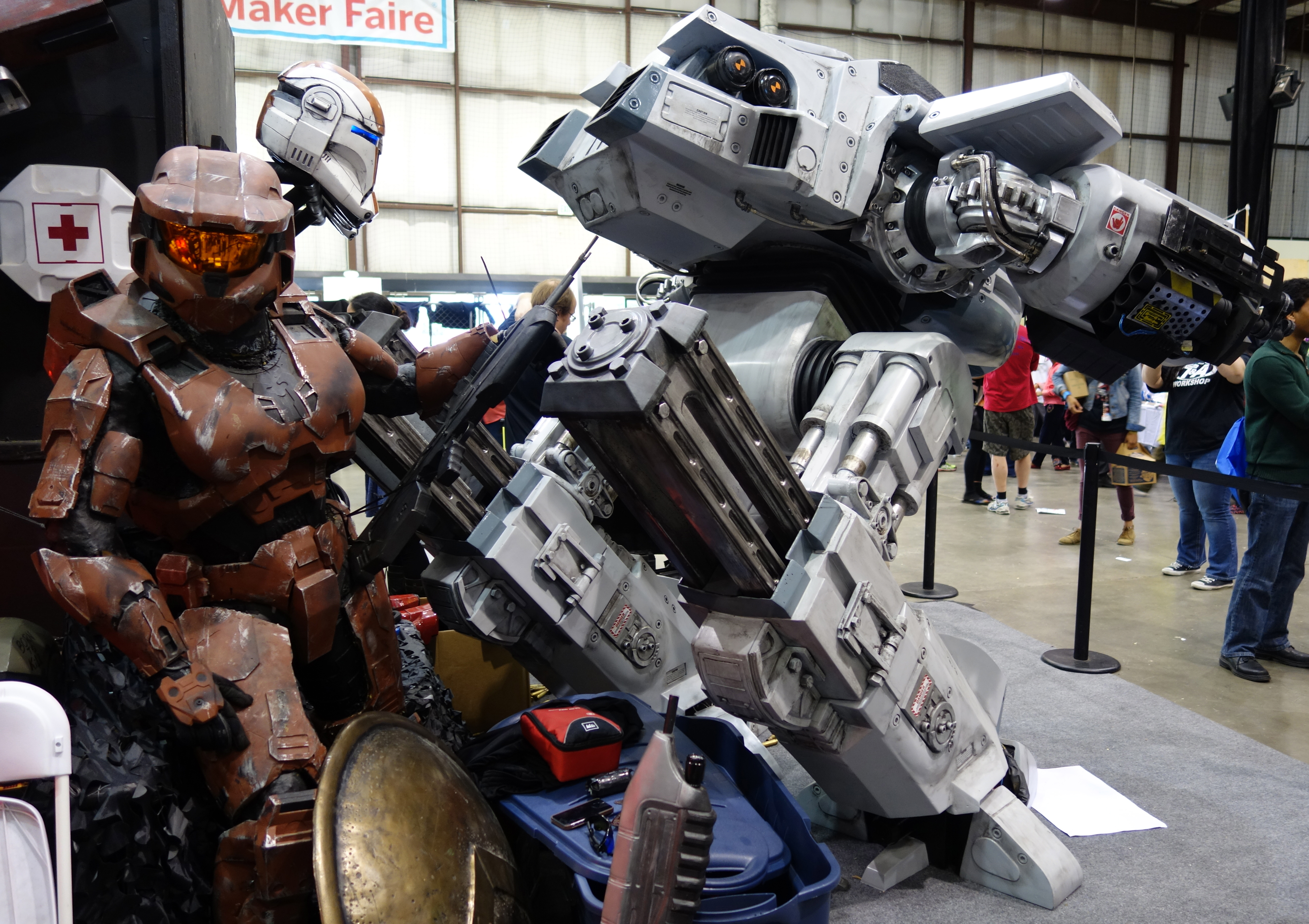
A re-creation of ED-209 displayed with a Spartan at a Maker Faire in 2014.

The Enforcement Droid Series 209, or ED-209 (pronounced Ed Two Oh Nine), is a fictional heavily armed robot that appears in the RoboCop franchise. It serves as a foil for RoboCop, as well as a source of comic relief due to its lack of intelligence and tendency towards clumsy malfunctions.

== Appearances ==
The Enforcement Droid Series 209, or ED-209 (pronounced Ed Two Oh Nine), is a massive, armed robot, with twin cannons on its left and right sides, a large, oblong visor much like a cockpit (despite the robot piloting itself) and legs with backwards-facing knees. Despite its intimidating demeanor, the robot was a poor choice for combat as it was prone to malfunction. For instance, during a boardroom demonstration by Dick Jones of ED-209's "disarm and arrest" procedure with a board executive named Kinney as the test subject, in which Kinney is given a pistol and told to point it at ED-209, ED-209 fails to recognize that Kinney has dropped his weapon and blasts him to death in over-the-top fashion with its automatic cannons. Later, it is shown that ED-209 cannot climb or descend stairs as it tumbles trying to chase RoboCop. The ED-209 is featured in every RoboCop major motion picture, while it is missing from the series' direct-to-video releases, and the television series features an ED with a different model number.

=== Animated series ===
ED-260, an upgraded version of the Enforcement Droid Series 209 first appeared the episode "Crime Wave" of the 1988 animated series RoboCop (voiced by Allen Stewart-Coates), serving as a recurring character throughout the series as its creator attempts to sabotage RoboCop.

=== Video games ===
The ED-209 is also used as a boss in RoboCop computer and video games, and the video game RoboCop versus The Terminator. In the 2003 RoboCop game for the Xbox, the ED-209 appeared at several points as a boss or boss-like enemy. The game also featured an upgraded design based on the 209, called the ED-1000. ED-209 appears as a traversal emote in Fortnite Battle Royale. In Mortal Kombat 11, ED-209 appears in RoboCop's fatal blow, one of his intros, and his fatality called "Dead or Alive". Additionally, ED-209 appears as both an ally and a boss in the 2023 game RoboCop: Rogue City.

=== Comic appearances ===
There were two ED-209s in the comic RoboCop versus The Terminator (though it is mentioned that there are 200 of them deployed), assisting RoboCop in shooting down a trio of Terminators bent on killing Flo. However, their limited intelligence remained a problem. In one instance, when ordered by RoboCop to "scan for cybernetic activity", the ED-209s immediately registered RoboCop as a target and opened fire, hitting each other by accident before apologizing to RoboCop. They later helped in shooting the Terminators, managing to double team and destroy one of the Terminators.

In Marvel's 1990 RoboCop comic, OCP Vice President Donald Johnson orders the creation of the ED-309.

== Development ==
=== RoboCop (1987) ===
Phil Tippett developed preliminary sketches of ED-209 to budget for its development and hired Davies to design the full-scale model and construct it with Paula Lucchesi. Verhoeven wanted ED-209 to look mean and believed Davies' early designs lacked a "killer" aesthetic. Craig Hayes took over designing and constructing of ED-209. He was influenced by killer whales and a United States Air Force Corsair Jet. He approached the design with modern American aesthetics and corporate design policy that he believed prioritized looks over functionality, including excessive and impractical components. He did not add eyes because they would make ED-209 more sympathetic.

Hayes made an 8 in (20 cm) scale model from which he made a mold that was cut into cross-sections and sketched on graph paper to measure when scaling the design up for the full-size model that was carved in wood. Molds were made from the wood model and mainly constructed from fiberglass and held together by a separate wood frame. The finished model took four months to build at a cost of $25,000, stood 7 ft (2.1 m) tall, and weighed 300 to 500 lb (140 to 230 kg). The 100-hour working weeks took their toll, and Hayes decided to make ED-209's feet minimal in detail as he did not think they would be shown on camera. Only the head of the model was articulated in one axis but its movement was rarely shown on screen. It served as a reference point for actors in scenes. Despite reports, the model was not destroyed during filming and was sent out on promotional tours after.

Davies spent a further four months to build two 12 in (30 cm) miniature replicas that were made as light as possible so that the armature need not be bulky. 55 shots were to be completed in three months, and two models allowed scenes to be shot simultaneously to save time. Tippett led the stop motion animation of ED-209. He conceived its movement as "unanimal"-like as if it was constantly about to fall over before catching itself. Tippett set up and animated one model, and Harry Walton lit and setup the other. Tippett credited Randal M. Dutra with the bulk of the animation in RoboCop using Walton's setups. Live-action background plates were projected on screens behind the models and animated one frame at a time. A blur was added to make the movement appear more natural by gently shaking the model or set as needed. Walton animated ED-209 falling down the stairs on a 4 ft (1.2 m) square miniature set. The model was filled with lead and allow to fall as Tippett believed attempting to animate the fall would have looked terrible. A difficult shot was ED-209 stepping over the camera; the off-screen elements of the model were gradually disassembled as it moved forward to fit above the camera. To complete the character, it was given the roar of a leopard. Davison provided a temporary voiceover for ED-209's speaking voice, which was retained in the film.

=== RoboCop (2014) ===
In July 2012, a redesigned ED-209 was revealed in the OmniCorp viral website. The new ED-209 is slimmer in design and more heavily armed than the original version. The 2014 version is also much more capable in performing its duties than the original.

== Reception ==
=== Critical Response ===
ED-209 has been widely praised by critics and film historians as one of the most memorable and iconic cinematic robots of the 1980's. Reviewers have often highlighted the dark comedic irony of the character––specifically that its military-grade firepower and terrifying aesthetic are contrasted by a total lack of intelligence and mechanical clumsiness (such as its inability to navigate stairs).

The characters introduction scene in the original 1987 Robocop, in which it malfunctions and kills an OCP executive during its live demonstration, is frequently cited as a masterclass in blending graphic sci-fi violence with corporate satire. Phil Tippett's stop motion animation of ED-209 received significant acclaim for giving the puppet a distinct, heavy, and animalistic weight that made it feel alive on-screen.

=== Cultural impact ===
- In an episode of The Simpsons ("I, D'oh-Bot"), Homer fights an ED-209 built by Professor Frink and his son in a robot-fighting television show called Robot Rumble.
- ED-209 appears in 3 episodes of South Park. He first appears in "Korn's Groovy Pirate Ghost Mystery", Kenny wears a life-sized ED-209 Halloween costume. "A Ladder to Heaven" featured an ED-209 guarding a house. In "The New Terrance and Phillip Movie Trailer", Chef's overly complicated television transforms into a robot resembling ED-209 in aesthetic and function.
- The computer real-time strategy game StarCraft features a unit (Terran Goliath) similar to the ED-209. When clicked on repeatedly the Golliath will say "Mil Spec E.D. 209 online." Another unit (Protoss Dragoon) when clicked on repeatedly can say the ED-209's quote, "Drop your weapon. You have 15 seconds to comply. 5, 4, 3, 2, 1..."
- ED-209 appears in the final sequences of Space Quest II: Vohaul's Revenge, before the player escapes from Vohaul's asteroid.
- A robot strongly resembling ED-209 is shown off by Genie in the film Aladdin and the King of Thieves.
- Police drones in Transformers: Animated resemble the ED-209, in which coincidentally the show's setting takes place also in a futuristic Detroit, and serve the same purpose, except this time they were in very large numbers and patrol the city, only to fall to the likes of the various characters of the show.
- American thrash metal band Lich King have a song titled "ED-209" on their third studio album, World Gone Dead.
- The popular 2024 cooperative third-person shooter game Helldivers 2 features a heavy enemy unit (The War Strider) for the Automaton enemy faction that closely resembles the ED-209.

=== Merchandise ===
- Kenner toys in 1990 featured an ED-209 figure in their RoboCop and the Ultra Police line. It had a rotating waist and articulated legs. The figure was not to scale and did not have any automatic actions or accessories. It was renamed "ED-260" for the line. the back of the "ED-260" can be opened to add roll caps which could be triggered with a small metal lever to simulate gunfire.
- Mez-Itz RoboCop line contained an SD (Super Deformed) ED-209 figure in its RoboCop figure pack, which also contained RoboCop and Officer Anne Lewis.
- Kotobukiya toys featured a figure line in Japan based on the RoboCop movies. ED-209 came in a singular pack which had to be assembled. Also, in a two-pack, RoboCop came with the damaged legs of the ED-209 from the first RoboCop film.
- JAM Japan has produced a 2.36 inch ED-209 figure.
- Horizon Models produced a vinyl 1/9 scale ED-209 model. Upon going out of business, the molds were bought by an unknown Thai manufacturer and the models were re-released.
- The same Thai manufacturer has a 1/12 scale ED-209 model as well.
- Hot Toys produced a 1/6 scale 15-inch ED-209 model as part of their Movie Masterpiece series - the popularity of this model later prompted the release of a battle-damaged version. This model was distributed by Sideshow Toys in America and Europe.
- BlueBrixx started producing interlocking brick construction sets under the Robocop license in 2024, including two differently scaled versions of ED-209.

== See also ==
- Lethal autonomous weapon

== Works cited ==
- Bates, Dan (December 1987). "On Location With The Cast & Crew of RoboCop". Cinefantastique. Vol. 18, no. 1. Forest Park, Illinois, United States: Fourth Castle Micromedia. pp. 16–25.
- Bates, Dan (December 1987). "The Making of ED-209". Cinefantastique. Vol. 18, no. 1. Forest Park, Illinois, United States: Fourth Castle Micromedia. p. 25.
- Niderost, Eric (April 1987). "On The Beat With "Robocop"". Starlog. No. 117. United States: Starlog Group, Inc. pp. 58–61.
- Sammon, Paul M. (November 1987). "Shooting RoboCop". Cinefex. No. 32. United States. ISSN 0198-1056. Archived from the original on March 4, 2022.
- Wallach, Wendell; Allen, Colin (2010), Moral Machines – Teaching Robots Right from Wrong, OUP USA, ISBN 9780199737970
- Holland, Samantha (2001), "Descartes goes to Hollywood", in Jessica R. Johnston (ed.), The American Body in Context, Scholarly Resources, pp. 13–14, ISBN 9780842028592
- Pettigrew, Neil (1999), The Stop-motion Filmography –A Critical Guide to 297 Features Using Puppet Animation, McFarland, pp. 586–587, ISBN 9780786404469
