= RoboCop (franchise) =

Cyberpunk media franchise

- Franchise logo
- Created by: Michael Miner; Edward Neumeier
- Original work: RoboCop (1987)
- Owner: Amazon MGM Studios
- Years: 1987–present

Print publications
- Comics: List of comics

Films and television
- Films: Original series: RoboCop (1987); RoboCop 2 (1990); RoboCop 3 (1993); Remake: RoboCop (2014)
- Television series: RoboCop (1994); RoboCop: Prime Directives (2001); RoboDoc: The Creation of RoboCop (2023)
- Animated series: RoboCop (1988); RoboCop: Alpha Commando (1998–1999)

Games
- Video games: List of video games

Audio
- Soundtracks: RoboCop (1987); RoboCop 2 (1990); RoboCop 3 (1993); A Future to This Life: Robocop – The Series Soundtrack (1995)

RoboCop is an American cyberpunk action media franchise featuring the futuristic adventures of Alex Murphy, a Detroit, Michigan police officer, who is brutally murdered in the line of duty and resurrected into a powerful cyborg, brand-named RoboCop, at the behest of a powerful mega-corporation, Omni Consumer Products. Thus equipped, Murphy battles both violent crime in a severely decayed city and the blatantly corrupt machinations within OCP.

The franchise began in 1987 with the film RoboCop. RoboCop 2 followed in 1990, and RoboCop 3 in 1993. There have also been various television series, video game and comic book tie-ins. The franchise has made over US$100 million worldwide and a remake serving as a reboot titled RoboCop was released in February 2014. A new installment titled RoboCop Returns is in the works and will serve as a direct sequel to the 1987 film, ignoring other sequels, the remake, as well as the two live-action TV spin-offs. As of June 2019, the script, which will be based on an original story from the writers of the 1987 film, Edward Neumeier and Michael Miner, was still being written. Neill Blomkamp was originally signed on to direct the film but left the project, and Abe Forsythe was later selected to direct.

== Films ==
Film	U.S. release date	Director(s)	Screenwriter(s)	Story by	Producer(s)
Original series
RoboCop	July 17, 1987	Paul Verhoeven	Michael Miner & Edward Neumeier	Michael Miner & Edward Neumeier	Arne Schmidt
RoboCop 2	June 22, 1990	Irvin Kershner	Walon Green & Frank Miller	Frank Miller	Jon Davison
RoboCop 3	November 5, 1993	Fred Dekker	Fred Dekker & Frank Miller	Frank Miller	Patrick Crowley
Remake
RoboCop	February 12, 2014	José Padilha	Michael Miner, Joshua Zetumer & Edward Neumeier	Michael Miner, Joshua Zetumer & Edward Neumeier	Eric Newman & Marc Abraham

=== RoboCop (1987) ===
RoboCop is a 1987 American cyberpunk action film directed by Paul Verhoeven. Set in a crime-ridden Detroit, Michigan, RoboCop centers on a police officer who is brutally murdered and subsequently re-created as a super-human cyborg known as "RoboCop". The film features Peter Weller, Dan O'Herlihy, Kurtwood Smith, Nancy Allen, Miguel Ferrer, and Ronny Cox.

In addition to being an action film, RoboCop includes larger themes regarding the media, resurrection, gentrification, corruption, privatization, capitalism, masculinity, and human nature. It received positive reviews and was cited as one of the best films of 1987, spawning a large franchise, including merchandise, two sequels, a television series, two animated TV series, and a television mini-series, video games and a number of comic book adaptations/crossovers. The film was produced for a relatively modest $13 million.

=== RoboCop 2 (1990) ===
RoboCop 2 is a 1990 cyberpunk action film directed by Irvin Kershner and starring Peter Weller, Nancy Allen, Dan O'Herlihy, Belinda Bauer, Tom Noonan and Gabriel Damon. It is the sequel to the 1987 film, and pits RoboCop against another cyborg created with the intention of replacing him.

The film received mixed reviews from critics. It was the last film directed by Kershner.

=== RoboCop 3 (1993) ===
RoboCop 3 is a cyberpunk action film directed and co-written by Fred Dekker, released in 1993, set in the near future in a dystopian metropolitan Detroit, Michigan, and filmed in Atlanta, Georgia. Most of the buildings seen in the film were slated for demolition to make way for facilities for the 1996 Olympics. Nancy Allen as Anne Lewis, Robert DoQui as Sgt. Warren Reed, Felton Perry as Donald Johnson, Mario Machado as Newscaster Casey Wong and Angie Bolling as Ellen Murphy are the only cast members to appear in all three films. Robert John Burke replaces Peter Weller as RoboCop.

The film received very negative reviews from critics. It was the first film in the RoboCop franchise to be rated PG-13.

=== RoboCop (2014) ===
A remake of the original film and a reboot of the franchise was released in early 2014. The film is directed by Brazilian filmmaker José Padilha and stars Joel Kinnaman in the title role. Gary Oldman and Samuel L. Jackson co-star in supporting roles. According to Kinnaman, the film is a reimagination of the original story, and bits and pieces cater to fans of the original film. In July 2012, a viral website for the fictional OmniCorp was opened to promote the film. Two months later in September, MGM and Columbia Pictures released the official film plot:

In RoboCop, set in the year 2028, multinational conglomerate OmniCorp is at the forefront of robot technology. Their drones are winning wars around the world, and now they seek to bring this technology to the home front. Alex Murphy (Kinnaman) is a devoted husband, father, and dedicated cop, fighting to combat crime and corruption in Detroit. After he is critically injured in the line of duty, OmniCorp uses their advanced robotics to save his life. He returns to the streets of his beloved city with incredible new abilities, but also grapples with challenges a regular man has never had to face.

=== Future ===
In January 2018, original RoboCop writer Ed Neumeier said that he was writing a direct sequel to the 1987 film, which would ignore both sequels and the 2014 remake: "We're not supposed to say too much. ... I would say this would be kind of going back to the old RoboCop we all love and starting there and going forward. So it's a continuation really of the first movie. In my mind. So it's a little bit more of the old school thing." In July 2018 it was reported that RoboCop Returns would be directed by Neill Blomkamp and scripted by Justin Rhodes, based on the original, unused screenplay written by Neumeier and Michael Miner for RoboCop 2. In 2019, Neumeier said that Blomkamp wanted RoboCop Returns to be as close to the first film as possible, explaining that Blomkamp thought that "it should be the proper Verhoeven if Verhoeven had directed a movie right after RoboCop." In June, Blomkamp said that the script continued to be developed, and confirmed that the original RoboCop suit would be used in RoboCop Returns, responding "1 million% original" to a fan's question on the subject on Twitter. In August 2019, Blomkamp announced that he would no longer be directing the film, in favor of developing a horror movie instead. By November, he was replaced as director by Abe Forsythe.

In March 2023, after Amazon acquired MGM, they identified RoboCop as one of the company's priorities. In April, Amazon Studios announced the development of a RoboCop television series and film, with the former possibly produced first.

== Television ==
Series	Season	Episodes	First released	Last released	Showrunner(s)	Network(s)
RoboCop	1	12	October 1, 1988	December 17, 1988	Rich Fogel & Mark Seidenberg	Broadcast syndication
RoboCop	1	21 & 1 Pilot	March 14, 1994	November 21, 1994	Michael Miner & Edward Neumeier	CTV
RoboCop: Alpha Commando	1	40	September 7, 1998	February 3, 1999	Eric Lewald & Julia Lewald	Broadcast syndication
RoboCop: Prime Directives	1	4	January 4, 2001	January 25, 2001	Brad Abraham & Joseph O'Brien	Space

=== RoboCop (1988) ===
Based on the original film, the first RoboCop animated series features cyborg cop Alex Murphy (RoboCop), who fights to save the city of Old Detroit from assorted rogue elements, and on occasion, fighting to reclaim aspects of his humanity and maintain his usefulness in the eyes of the "Old Man", Chairman of OCP. Many episodes see RoboCop's reputation put to the test or soured by interventions from Dr. McNamara, the creator of ED-260, the upgradable version of the Enforcement Droid Series 209 and the top competitor for the financial backing of OCP. He continually develops other mechanical menaces that threaten RoboCop. In the police force, RoboCop is befriended as always by Officer Anne Lewis, but is also picked on and lambasted by the prejudiced Lieutenant Roger Hedgecock (who appeared as a minor character in the original film and his first name revealed in "Night of the Archer"), ever determined to be rid of him and his kind, whom he sees as ticking time bombs. Their rivalry comes to a fever pitch during the episode "The Man in the Iron Suit", in which Hedgecock comes close to finally beating Murphy with the aid of a new weapons system developed by McNamara. He almost kills Lewis when she interferes, enraging Murphy into tearing Hedgecock's iron suit apart and nearly crushing his skull before Lewis emerges, alive and well. Robocop is maintained by Robocop Project director Dr. Tyler. He was voiced by Robert Bockstael.

=== RoboCop (1994) ===
RoboCop appears in RoboCop played by Richard Eden. The series takes place 4–5 years after the original film and ignores the events of the second and third films. Murphy's mother and father were introduced. His father, Russell Murphy, was a devout police officer himself for many years until his retirement. He is responsible for instilling Murphy with his trademark sense of duty and dedication to law enforcement, even after his transformation into a cyborg. Throughout the series, Murphy finds himself teamed up with his father on a few cases that often saw them utilizing the elder Murphy's expertise in dealing with reappearing criminals he'd chased back before his retirement. Although his father was stern, it was clear Murphy's parents loved and cherished him even after his 'demise'. However at the end of the episode "Corporate Raiders", Russell Murphy finds out that it's his son under the RoboCop enhancements. Ellen (known as Nancy in the series for apparent copyright reasons) and Jimmy Murphy were recurring characters as well, often finding themselves crossing paths with Murphy by falling in inadvertently or intentionally with the criminal element to which Murphy interfered and protected them from harm. Despite his series partner Madigan's concerns to tell his family who he is, Murphy replied firmly, "No", as he felt doing so would hurt them even more. He commented that "they need a husband... and a father. I cannot be that. But I can protect them".

=== RoboCop: Alpha Commando (1998–1999) ===
RoboCop appears in RoboCop: Alpha Commando voiced by David Sobolov. The series is set in the year 2030 and deals with RoboCop being reactivated after five years offline to assist a federal high-tech group, "Alpha Division" in their vigilance and struggle against DARC (Directorate for Anarchy, Revenge, and Chaos), a highly advanced terrorist organization and other forces of evil whenever that may be, globally or nationally. The series shared many of the same writers who had contributed to the 1980s animated series, but had even less in common with the films or television canon that it was based on, including the first animated series. RoboCop now has numerous gadgets in his body that were never in the film, such as roller skates and a parachute. The show also suffers from major continuity errors. In the first episodes, RoboCop's son appears in his memories flashback and he appears to be around ten. He appears in the series, to be exactly the same age and even wearing the same clothing, as his memories. The absence of Anne Lewis was never explained. Besides RoboCop himself, Sgt. Reed is the only character from the films in the series. Unlike the films, and previous TV incarnations, RoboCop never takes off his helmet in Alpha Commando.

=== RoboCop: Prime Directives (2001) ===
RoboCop appears in RoboCop: Prime Directives played by Page Fletcher. The series takes place ten years after the original film. Alex Murphy as RoboCop has become outdated, tired, and quasi-suicidal. Delta City (formerly Detroit) is now considered the safest place on Earth, and he is no longer viewed as particularly necessary. The first half of the series focuses on Alex Murphy's former partner, John T. Cable, who is slain by RoboCop due to his system being hacked and being programmed to terminate Cable. Cable is then resurrected as a cyborg in most aspects identical to the RoboCop model, save for color and the addition of a second sidearm. "RoboCable" is sent to destroy RoboCop, but after several battles, Cable is convinced to join Murphy. Meanwhile, OCP (on the verge of bankruptcy) is taken over by a scheming executive, Damian Lowe, who manages to murder the entire board of directors. To bring OCP back, he plans to use an artificial intelligence called SAINT to automate the entire city. The second half of the series introduces Dr. David Kaydick, who plans to introduce a "bio-tech" virus (Legion) to wipe out not only Delta City but all life on the planet, infecting computers and people alike. He takes control of RoboCable by planting a chip in him that causes him pain or death, at Kaydick's discretion. RoboCop receives aid from a group of tech thieves led by Ann R. Key (Leslie Hope), who are determined to stop Kaydick, and RoboCop's own son, James – now fully grown and aware of his father's fate. RoboCop and his rag-tag band race to stop Kaydick from infiltrating OCP tower and activating SAINT, which would presumably kill almost all humans. During the confrontation, RoboCop and James reconcile with each other, and manage to rekindle RoboCable's previous personality. Ann. R. Key and Kaydick both die during a confrontation with each other. Utilizing James's EMP device, and having shut down RoboCop, RoboCable and LEGION are terminated. RoboCop gets rebooted without his previous OCP restriction programming (as well as restoring his identity as "Alex Murphy" as opposed to an OCP product number) or his prime directives. After viewing a goodbye message left by Cable, Murphy returns to active duty to stop the resultant crime in Delta City due to the EMP pulse blacking out the city.

=== RoboCop (TBA) ===
Ed Neumeier revealed to MovieHole that a RoboCop prequel TV series is in development that will focus on a young Dick Jones and the rise of Omni Consumer Products. On September 25, 2024, Deadline reported that a RoboCop TV series was in development with Peter Ocko as a writer, executive producer and showrunner and James Wan as an executive producer through his Blumhouse-Atomic Monster banner. In July 2026, the series was ordered by Amazon Prime Video. In August 2026, Dan Stevens was cast as Alex Murphy/RoboCop.

== Cast and crew ==
=== Principal cast ===
List indicators
- A dark gray cell indicates the character did not appear in that installment.
- An ^{A} indicates an appearance through previously recorded material.
- A ^{U} indicates an actor or actress was uncredited for their respective role.
- A ^{Y} indicates an actor or actress portrayed a younger version of their character.

Character	Original series			Animated series		Television series		Video games		Remake
Character	RoboCop	RoboCop 2	RoboCop 3	RoboCop	RoboCop: Alpha Commando	RoboCop	RoboCop: Prime Directives	RoboCop	RoboCop: Rogue City	RoboCop
Officer Alex Murphy RoboCop	Peter Weller	Peter Weller	Robert Burke	Robert Bockstael	David Sobolov	Richard Eden	Page Fletcher	John More	Peter Weller	Joel Kinnaman
Officer Anne Lewis	Nancy Allen	Nancy Allen	Nancy Allen	Susan Roman				Azita Deghestani	Kosha Engler	Michael K. Williams (Note: In the original Robocop films, the character of Alex Murphy's partner is female and is known as Anne Lewis. In the 2014 remake, this character is male and is known as Jack Lewis.)
Sergeant Warren Reed	Robert DoQui	Robert DoQui	Robert DoQui	Greg Morton	Blu Mankuma				Bruce Lester Johnson	
Donald Johnson	Felton Perry	Felton Perry	Felton Perry							
Casey Wong	Mario Machado	Mario Machado	Mario Machado	Len Carlson					TBA	
Ellen Murphy	Angie Bolling	Angie Bolling	Angie Bolling	Photograph	Unspecified voice actress	Jennifer Griffin (Note: Known as Nancy Murphy in the 1994 television series)			TBA	Abbie Cornish (Note: Known as Clara Murphy in the 2014 remake)
James "Jimmy" Murphy	Jason Levine	Clinton Austin Shirley	Uncredited actor	Photograph	Uncredited voice actor	Peter Costigan	Anthony Lemke		TBA	John Paul Ruttan (Note: Known as David Murphy in the 2014 remake)
James "Jimmy" Murphy	Jason Levine	Clinton Austin Shirley	Uncredited actor	Photograph	Uncredited voice actor	Jordan Hughes^{Y}	Anthony Lemke		TBA	John Paul Ruttan
The Old Man	Daniel O'Herlihy	Daniel O'Herlihy		Allen Stewart-Coates				Randall Roberts	Mark Holden	
Jess Perkins	Leeza Gibbons	Leeza Gibbons								
ED-209	Jon Davison	Appeared	Jon Davison					Appeared	Appeared	Jimmy Chimarios^{U}
Clarence Boddicker	Kurtwood Smith		Kurtwood Smith^{A}	Len Carlson		Kurtwood Smith^{A}	Kurtwood Smith^{A}			
Richard "Dick" Jones	Ronny Cox									
Robert "Bob" Morton	Miguel Ferrer									
Emil Antonowsky	Paul McCrane		Paul McCrane^{A}			Paul McCrane^{A}	Paul McCrane^{A}			
Leon Nash	Ray Wise		Ray Wise^{A}	Silent role		Ray Wise^{A}	Ray Wise^{A}			
Joe Cox	Jesse D. Goins		Jesse D. Goins^{A}	Gordon Maston						
Steve Minh	Calvin Jung		Calvin Jung^{A}			Calvin Jung^{A}	Calvin Jung^{A}			
Dr. Tyler	Sage Parker			Barbara Budd						
Lieutenant Roger Hedgecock	Michael Gregory			Rex Hagon						
Bixby Snyder	S.D. Nemeth		S.D. Nemeth							
Dr. McNamara	Jerry Haynes			Robert Bockstael						
Cecil	Laird Stuart			Chris Ward						
Roosevelt	Stephen Berrier			Greg Morton						
Cain RoboCop 2		Tom Noonan							Appeared	
Hob		Gabriel Damon								
Angie		Galyn Görg								
Dr. Juliette Faxx		Belinda Baur								
Mayor of Detroit	Uncredited actor	Willard Pugh (Note: This version of the Mayor is known as Marvin Kuzak in RoboCop 2.)							TBA	Douglas Urbanski
Holzgang		Jeff McCarthy								
Schenk		John Dolittle								
Officer Duffy		Stephen Lee								
Linda Garcia		Patricia Charbonneau^{U}								
Paulos		Phil Rubenstein								
Dr. Marie Lazarus			Jill Hennessy							
Nikko Halloran			Remy Ryan							
Paul McDagget			John Castle							
Bertha Washington			CCH Pounder							
Coontz			Stephen Root							
Zack			Stanley Anderson							
Moreno			Daniel Von Bargen							
OCP CEO			Rip Torn							
Jeff Fleck			Bradley Whitford							
Otomo			Bruce Locke							
Mr. Kanemitsu			Mako						Silent cameo	
Alpha Prime					Campbell Lane					
Mr. Brink					Jim Byrnes					
Lisa Madigan						Yvette Nipar				
Sergeant Stanley Park						Blu Mankuma				
Diana Powers						Andrea Roth				
Gertrude "Gadget" Modesto						Sarah Campbell				
John T. Cable RoboCable							Maurice Dean Wint			
Wendell Antonowsky									Joseph Capp	
Dr. Dennett Norton										Gary Oldman
Raymond Sellars										Michael Keaton
Patrick "Pat" Novak										Samuel L. Jackson
Rick Mattox										Jackie Earle Haley

=== Additional crew ===
Film	Director(s)	Producer(s)	Screenwriter(s)	Composer(s)	Cinematographer	Editor(s)
RoboCop	Paul Verhoeven	Arne Schmidt	Michael Miner; Edward Neumeier	Basil Poledouris	Jost Vacano	Frank J. Urioste
RoboCop 2	Irvin Kershner	Jon Davison	screenplay: Walon Green; Frank Miller story: Frank Miller	Leonard Rosenman	Mark Irwin	Lee Smith; Armen Minasian; Deborah Zeitman
RoboCop 3	Fred Dekker	Patrick Crowley	screenplay: Fred Dekker; Frank Miller story: Frank Miller	Basil Poledouris	Gary B. Kibbe	Bert Lovitt
RoboCop	José Padilha	Eric Newman; Marc Abraham	Joshua Zetumer	Pedro Bromfman	Lula Carvalho	Peter McNulty; Daniel Rezende

== Production ==
=== Recurring elements ===
==== Omni Consumer Products ====
Omni Consumer Products

In-universe information
- Type: Corporation and laboratory
- Founder: The "Old Man"
- Founded: 1990
- Location: Detroit and Delta City, Michigan
- Products: Computers; Robotics; Cybernetics; Consumer products; Space exploration; Urban Pacification Tools; Military grade weaponry; Food products; Private government

Omni Consumer Products (OCP) is a fictional corporatocratic megacorporation in the RoboCop franchise. It creates products for virtually every consumer need, has entered into endeavors normally deemed non-profit, and even manufactured an entire city to be maintained exclusively by the corporation. OCP is a modern example of the longstanding trope of the evil corporation in science fiction.

OCP is depicted as a megacorporation with products ranging from consumer products to military weaponry and private space travel. It also serves as the main antagonist of the RoboCop franchise. Their projects included RoboCop, the ED-209, and the RoboCop 2 cyborg. OCP owns and operates a privatized Detroit Police Department and in Robocop 3 employs criminals into a mercenary police outfit known as the Rehabs (short for Urban Rehabilitators).

OCP, throughout its depictions in the RoboCop films, has sought to fully privatize a dystopian Detroit, Michigan, into "Delta City", a manufactured municipality governed by a corporatocracy, with fully privatized services — such as police — and with residents exercising their representative citizenship through the purchase of shares of OCP stock. They also serve as part of the military–industrial complex; according to OCP executive Richard "Dick" Jones, "We practically are the military." Jones observes in RoboCop that OCP has "gambled in markets traditionally regarded as non-profit: hospitals, prisons, space exploration. I say good business is where you find it."

In RoboCop 3, OCP is bought out by a Japanese Zaibatsu, the Kanemitsu corporation. As a Kanemitsu subsidiary, OCP through its new CEO remains in charge of the destruction of old Detroit and the construction of Delta City by using the Rehabs as its police force, but are financially ruined whilst commander Paul McDaggett is killed by RoboCop. By the end of the film, OCP's brutal policies concerning Delta City are brought to light, many of OCP's majority shareholders sell their stock, and OCP itself is forced into bankruptcy.

In the live action TV series RoboCop, the OCP Chairman is played by David Gardner who still plans to undergo completion of Delta City under his MetroNet computer but is more a sympathetic character as he aides RoboCop against several enemies. He also oversees the new project NeuroBrain to monitor MetroNet by secretly-corrupted executive Chip Chayken and psychopathic genius Dr. Cray Z. Mallardo, who'd later menace OCP and RoboCop.

By the time of RoboCop: Prime Directives, OCP is being manipulated by Damien Lowe, a brash young executive who through murder and reallocation of resources, ascends to power to automate Delta City under a new artificial intelligence called S.A.I.N.T. This is manipulated by cyberterrorist David Kaydick, who seeks the destruction of the human race through a virus that can be introduced to computers and human beings alike.

For the 2014 remake, "OmniCorp" is a division of OCP, with the slogan "We've Got the Future Under Control." Led by CEO Raymond Sellars, OmniCorp is a leading manufacturer of military solutions worldwide, with their robots maintaining peace in hostile environments. However, due to the Dreyfus Act, which prohibits the use of robots for law enforcement, OmniCorp has been unable to penetrate the American market. Sellars plans to circumvent the bill by placing the body parts of critically injured Detroit Police officer Alex Murphy into a robotic suit.

== Reception ==
=== Box office performance ===
Film	Release date	Box office gross			Box office ranking	Budget	Reference
Film	Release date	North America	Other territories	Worldwide	All time North America	Budget	Reference
RoboCop	July 17, 1987	$53,424,681	—N/a	$53,424,681	—N/a	$13 million	
RoboCop 2	June 22, 1990	$45,681,173	—N/a	$45,681,173	—N/a	$25 million	
RoboCop 3	November 5, 1993	$10,696,210	$36,300,000	$46,996,210	—N/a	$22 million	
RoboCop	February 12, 2014	$58,607,007	$184,081,958	$242,688,965	—N/a	$130 million	
Total		$168,409,071	$220,381,958	$388,791,029		$190 million	

=== Critical and public response ===
Film	Rotten Tomatoes	Metacritic	CinemaScore
RoboCop	84% (184 reviews)	70 (17 reviews)	A−
RoboCop 2	31% (142 reviews)	42 (22 reviews)	B−
RoboCop 3	18% (101 reviews)	40 (15 reviews)	B+
RoboCop	49% (223 reviews)	52 (41 reviews)	B+

== Music ==
Title	U.S. release date	Length	Composer(s)	Label
RoboCop: Original Motion Picture Soundtrack	1987	41:49	Basil Poledouris	Varèse Sarabande
RoboCop 2: Original Motion Picture Soundtrack	1990	30:19	Leonard Rosenman	Varèse Sarabande
RoboCop 3: Original Motion Picture Soundtrack	1993	28:31	Basil Poledouris	Varèse Sarabande
A Future to This Life: Robocop – The Series Soundtrack	1995	36:38	Joe Walsh and various artists	Pyramid Records
RoboCop: Original Motion Picture Soundtrack	2014	54:28	Pedro Bromfman	Sony Classical Records

== Other media ==
In February 2011, there was a humorous ploy asking Detroit Mayor Dave Bing if there was to be a RoboCop statue in his 'New Detroit' proposal, which is planned to turn Detroit back into a prosperous city again. When the Mayor said there was no such plan, and word of this reached the internet, there were several fund-raising events to raise enough money for the statue which would be built. The statue has been built.

=== Video games ===
Various licensed video games for various arcade, console and computer systems were released:

- RoboCop (1988)
- RoboCop 2 (1991)
- RoboCop 3 (1992)
- RoboCop Versus The Terminator (1993)
- RoboCop (2003)
- RoboCop: Rogue City (2023)

=== Pinball ===
In 1989, Data East released a pinball machine based on the film.

=== Novelization ===
A mass market paperback novelization by Ed Naha, titled RoboCop 2: A Novel, was published by Jove Books. Marvel Comics produced a three-issue adaptation of the film by Alan Grant. Like the novelization, the comic book series includes scenes omitted from the finished movie.

=== Comic books ===
Various publishers have released RoboCop comic books:

- RoboCop (Marvel Comics, 1990–1992) – 23 issues, plus adaptations of the first two films.
- RoboCop versus The Terminator (Dark Horse Comics, 1992) which was also a video game and almost a film.
- RoboCop (Dark Horse Comics, 1992–1994), 13 issues; consisted of three mini-series (four issues each), plus adaptation of RoboCop 3
- RoboCop (Avatar Press, 2003–2006) – 11 issues; consisted of a nine-issue series and two one-shot comics.
- RoboCop (Dynamite Entertainment, 2009–2013) – 14 issues; consisted of a six-issue series and two four-issue series.
- RoboCop (Boom! Studios, 2013–2018) – 34 issues as of February 2016, including a reprint of Avatar's nine-issue series.

=== Theme park ride ===
SimEx-iWerks (formerly iWerks Entertainment) opened RoboCop: The Ride around the world at its various iWerks Motion Simulator Theaters, amusement parks, and casinos in the winter of 1995. The "Turbo Ride," as it was termed, was a Motion simulator "ride" attraction which could accommodate between 20 and 30 guests, and featured an oversized screen displaying the projection placed in front of synchronized hydraulically activated seats. The attraction was a mixture of motion picture film and computer animation, lasting approximately 4:00 minutes. The cost in the United States was $5.00 at pay-per-ride theaters. The attraction focused on the guest partnering with RoboCop, riding specialized police motorcycles on a mission to save the mayor of Detroit from "Cyberpunk ROM" and his gang. In the latter part of the attraction, the motorcycle would then convert into "hover mode" and simulate flying through the skyline of New Detroit. Though not as impressive or technical-savvy as other iWerks attractions at the time, the attraction was very popular amongst children and teenagers and especially in foreign markets outside of North America. The attraction was removed from the iWerks theaters in the North American market in 1998.

=== Advertisements ===
In early 2019, fast food franchise Kentucky Fried Chicken announced that the latest celebrity to play the Colonel would be RoboCop. A series of commercials were produced with original actor Peter Weller reprising his role. In 2021, RoboCop appeared in one of a series of advertisements in the UK for the insurance company Direct Line, played by actor and stuntman Derek Mears.

=== Other appearances ===
- An action figure of RoboCop comes to life alongside Star Wars and Jurassic Park toys in The Indian in the Cupboard (1995).
- RoboCop appears in Steven Spielberg's film Ready Player One. He appears as an avatar within the OASIS game world. RoboCop is shown entering the OASIS and later seen during the Battle of Castle of Anorak where he fought the Sixers.
- Mortal Kombat 11, a fighting game released a downloadable content expansion pack titled "Aftermath" which added RoboCop, with Peter Weller reprising his role since the second film, as one of three new playable characters.
- RoboCop was added as a purchasable outfit in the online battle royale game Fortnite on May 16, 2022. Additionally, ED-209 appears as an emote.

== Bibliography ==
- Sammon, Paul M. (November 1987). "Shooting RoboCop". Cinefex. No. 32. United States. ISSN 0198-1056.
