= A Future to This Life: Robocop – The Series Soundtrack =

Soundtrack album by Joe Walsh with various artists
- Released: January 24, 1995
- Recorded: 1994
- Genres: Rock; hard rock; pop rock; jazz
- Length: 36:38
- Label: Pyramid
- Producers: Joe Walsh; Bill Szymczyk; Dave Edmunds; Kevin D. Sepe; Todd Rundgren; Richard Barret; John Simon; The Band; Aaron L. Hurwitz; Scott Maclellan; Jim Hilton; H.W. Casey; R. Finch; Kevin Gillis; John Stroll

Joe Walsh chronology
Songs for a Dying Planet (1992)	A Future to This Life: Robocop – The Series Soundtrack (1995)	Look What I Did! (1995)

RoboCop chronology
RoboCop 3 (1993)	A Future to This Life: Robocop – The Series Soundtrack (1995)	RoboCop (2014)

Professional ratings
Review scores
Source	Rating
AllMusic	2/5 stars

A Future to This Life: Robocop – The Series Soundtrack is a 1995 television soundtrack album by Joe Walsh with various artists, which was released on January 24, 1995, on both CD and cassette by Pyramid. It was the soundtrack for the 1994 TV series RoboCop, based on the RoboCop film series.

Aside from the show's theme writers Walsh and Lita Ford, it features classic rock songs from The Band, The Flamingos, Iron Butterfly, and KC & the Sunshine Band. It also marked the final contribution for pianist and organist Nicky Hopkins, who died the year before its release.

== Track listing ==
No.	Title	Writer(s)	Performed by	Length
1.	"A Future to This Life"	Kevin Gillis; Jack Lenz	Joe Walsh & Lita Ford	3:35
2.	"Guilty of the Crime"	Frankie Miller; Jerry Lynn Williams	Joe Walsh	3:26
3.	"Fire and Brimstone"	Link Wray	Joe Walsh	5:01
4.	"Chutes & Ladders"	John David	Dave Edmunds	4:05
5.	"Flannel Jacket"	Kevin Sepe	E. J. Waters	3:50
6.	"We Gotta Get You a Woman"	Todd Rundgren	Todd Rundgren	2:52
7.	"I Only Have Eyes for You"	Al Dubin; Harry Warren	The Flamingos	3:15
8.	"Stuff You Gotta Watch"	Muddy Waters	The Band	2:48
9.	"In-A-Gadda-Da-Vida"	Doug Ingle	Iron Butterfly	2:50
10.	"(Shake, Shake, Shake) Shake Your Booty"	H.W. Casey; Richard Finch	KC and the Sunshine Band	3:04
11.	"Robocop Overture"	Kevin Gillis	Delta City Orchestra	1:57
Total length:				36:38

== Personnel ==
Credits are adapted from the album's liner notes.

- Joe Walsh – lead vocals, guitar, percussion, sound effects, backing vocals
- Lita Ford – lead vocals, guitar, backing vocals
- Levon Helm – lead vocals, drums
- Dave Edmunds – lead vocals
- E.J. Waters – lead vocals
- Frankie Miller – lead vocals
- Andy Goldman – guitar, backing vocals
- Jim Weider – guitar, backing vocals
- Joe Vitale – keyboards, drums, percussion
- Garth Hudson – keyboards
- Nicky Hopkins – keyboards
- Randy Ciarlante – drums, backing vocals
- Jack Ciano – drums
- Ian Wallace – drums
- Bobby Strickland – tenor saxophone, baritone saxophone
- Dave Douglas – trumpet
- Richard Bell – organ
- Vassar Clements – fiddle
- Kevin Sepe – backing vocals
- Rick Danko – backing vocals
