= Omni Consumer Products (company) =

American manufacturing industry

- Founder: Pete Hottelet
- Headquarters: Detroit, United States
- Website: omniconsumer.com

Omni Consumer Products, founded in 2006 by graphic designer Pete Hottelet, is a company that creates "real-world" versions of certain products created in movies. The company takes its name from the fictional corporation of the same name featured in the RoboCop movie and television franchise. The company's products include a "Brawndo" beverage inspired by Idiocracy, "Stay Puft Caffeinated Gourmet Marshmallows" inspired by Ghostbusters, and a "Tru Blood" beverage inspired by HBO's True Blood series. The company also has licensed the rights to produce and market "Sex Panther", an Eau de Cologne in Anchorman: The Legend of Ron Burgundy. For a few months in 2009, Omni Consumer Products was a sponsor of Kevin Smith and Scott Mosier's podcast, SModcast.

The company contributed $25,000 towards the construction of a RoboCop statue in Detroit.
