= RoboCop 2 (soundtrack) =

RoboCop 2: Original Motion Picture Soundtrack

Soundtrack album by Leonard Rosenman
- Released: 1990; March 15, 2019 (Deluxe Edition)
- Recorded: May, 1990
- Genre: Film score
- Length: 30:19; 69:58 (Deluxe Edition)
- Label: Varèse Sarabande
- Producer: Leonard Rosenman

Leonard Rosenman chronology
Where Pigeons Go to Die (1990)	RoboCop 2: Original Motion Picture Soundtrack (1990)	Aftermath: A Test of Love (1991)

RoboCop chronology
RoboCop (1987)	RoboCop 2 (1990)	RoboCop 3 (1993)

Professional ratings
Review scores
Source	Rating
AllMusic	3/5 stars

RoboCop 2: Original Motion Picture Soundtrack is the soundtrack to the film of the same name, composed by Leonard Rosenman and released by Varèse Sarabande in 1990. An expanded version of the soundtrack was released in March 2019.

== Track listing ==
1990 release
No.	Title	Length
1.	"Overture: RoboCop"	6:05
2.	"City Mayhem"	3:39
3.	"Happier Days"	1:30
4.	"Robo Cruiser"	4:42
5.	"Robo Memories"	2:10
6.	"Robo and Nuke"	2:24
7.	"Robo Fanfare"	0:34
8.	"Robo and Cain Chase"	2:43
9.	"Creating the Monster"	2:50
10.	"Robo I vs. Robo II"	3:41
Total length:		30:19

2019 Deluxe Edition
No.	Title	Length
1.	"Overture: RoboCop 2"	6:08
2.	"Logo / MagnaVolt"	1:02
3.	"City Mayhem"	3:39
4.	"Robo and Nuke"	2:26
5.	"Cain and Angie Escape"	1:15
6.	"Happier Days"	1:32
7.	"Robo Memories"	2:11
8.	"Robo Cruiser"	4:43
9.	"Robo Gets Dumped"	0:56
10.	"Duffy Nukes / Robo in Pain / Duffy Gets Diced"	3:31
11.	"Robo Gets Faxxed"	2:01
12.	"Kids Rob Electronics / RoboSparks"	2:32
13.	"Nuke Lab / Nuke Lab Blows"	1:16
14.	"Robo and Cain Chase"	2:45
15.	"Creating the Monster"	2:50
16.	"Monster at Meeting"	0:45
17.	"Monster Cleans House / Monster Finds Angie"	1:52
18.	"Goodbye Angie"	3:29
19.	"Robo Finds Hob"	3:20
20.	"Robo Fanfare"	0:34
21.	"Elevated and Depressed"	3:27
22.	"On the Street Again / Robo Gets Nuke"	0:59
23.	"Robo I vs. Robo II"	3:44
24.	"Robo Resolve and End Credits"	6:56
25.	"Creating the Monster" (Film Version)	2:48
26.	"Robo Hangs Out" (Film Construct)	0:38
27.	"Monster Theme Stings"	0:50
28.	"Fanfare Suite"	1:01
29.	"Sunblock 5000"	0:47
Total length:		69:58
