= RoboCop (1988 TV series) =

1988 American animated television series

- Title card
- Genre: Action; Adventure; Cyberpunk; Superhero
- Created by: Edward Neumeier; Michael Miner
- Developed by: Rich Fogel; Mark Seidenberg
- Directed by: Bill Hutton(ep. 1–4); Tony Love(ep. 1–4); Ray Lee(ep. 5–12)
- Voices of: Robert Bockstael; Barbara Budd; Len Carlson; Rex Hagon; Dan Hennessey; Ron James; Greg Morton; Susan Roman; Allen Stewart-Coates; Chris Ward; Gordon Maston
- Music by: Haim Saban; Shuki Levy
- Country of origin: United States
- Original language: English
- No. of episodes: 12

Production
- Executive producers: Margaret Loesch; Joseph M. Taritero
- Producers: Bill Hutton (ep. 1–4); Tony Love (ep. 1–4); Boyd Kirkland (ep. 5–12)
- Running time: 30 minutes
- Production companies: Orion Pictures Corporation; Marvel Productions (Note: Animation outsourced to AKOM.)

Original release
- Network: Syndication
- Release: October 1 – December 17, 1988

Related
- RoboCop: Alpha Commando

RoboCop is a 1988 American superhero animated series based on the 1987 movie of the same name. The series was produced by Marvel Productions in association with Orion Pictures Corporation, and was syndicated by New World Television as part of the Marvel Action Universe programming block.

The show made a number of changes to the RoboCop universe to make it more appropriate for younger viewers, including replacing bullets with laser weapons and shifting the series to a more science fiction setting. In this series, RoboCop had a red light in the middle of his visor (which occasionally panned the whole visor). It is set in an alternate continuity where events similar to those shown in the movie happened, excluding the death of Clarence Boddicker, who appears in the last episode.

Ownership of the series passed to Disney in 2001 when Disney acquired Fox Kids Worldwide, which also included Marvel Productions, while Amazon MGM Studios remains as the current rights holder of the RoboCop franchise.

== Plot ==
Based on the original movie, the series features cyborg cop Alex Murphy (RoboCop), who fights to save the city of Old Detroit from assorted rogue elements, and on occasion, fighting to reclaim aspects of his humanity and maintain his usefulness in the eyes of the "Old Man", Chairman of Omni Consumer Products. Many episodes see RoboCop's reputation put to the test or soured by interventions from Dr. McNamara, the creator of ED-260, the upgradable version of the Enforcement Droid Series 209 and the top competitor for the financial backing of OCP. He continually develops other mechanical menaces that threaten RoboCop.

In the police force, RoboCop is befriended by Officer Anne Lewis, who is depicted to have romantic inclinations towards him, but is also picked on and lambasted by the prejudiced Lieutenant Roger Hedgecock (who appeared as a minor character in the original film), who is determined to be rid of him and his kind, who he sees as ticking time bomb. Their rivalry comes to a fever pitch during the episode "The Man in the Iron Suit", in which Hedgecock comes close to finally beating Murphy with the aid of a new weapons system developed by McNamara. He almost kills Lewis when she interferes, enraging Murphy into tearing Hedgecock's iron suit apart and nearly crushing his skull before Lewis comes to his aid. RoboCop is maintained by RoboCop Project director Dr. Tyler.

The title sequence features a brief animated variation on Murphy being gunned down by Clarence Boddicker and his gang. Throughout the series, RoboCop struggles to deal with the pain of losing his humanity. Other themes include racism ("The Brotherhood"), prejudice at work ("Man in the Iron Suit"), environmental espionage ("Into the Wilderness"), terrorism, and the Middle East peace process ("A Robot's Revenge").

While this series is based on the original film, there are significant changes to RoboCop and his environment. RoboCop is faster and has a greater range of movement than in the films. The Old Detroit of the series is also considerably more technologically advanced: lasers replace handguns and robots are commonplace, Dr. Tyler (who appears in the original film) is the creator of the RoboCop Program, not Bob Morton, and also serves as one of Murphy's confidants as well as his caregiver, along with Dr. Roosevelt. Clarence Boddicker, the man responsible for Alex Murphy's death prior to him becoming RoboCop, despite dying in the film, is shown to still be alive and battles RoboCop again in "Menace of the Mind", indicating the series takes place in an alternate continuity.

== Cast ==
- Robert Bockstael as RoboCop / Alex J. Murphy, Dr. McNamara
- Susan Roman as Officer Anne Lewis
- Harvey Atkin as K.R.U.D. Station Manager (in No News is Good News), Zocastani sheik (in A Robot's Revenge)
- Barbara Budd as Dr. Tyler
- Len Carlson as Lieutenant Roger Hedgecock, The Scrambler
- Allen Stewart-Coates as The Old Man, ED-260
- Rex Hagon
- Dan Hennessey as Vandel Chainsaw, "Ace" Jackson, "Birdman" Barnes, Edwards (in Into the Wilderness)
- Ron James as "Wheels" Wilson
- Gordon Masten as Joe Cox
- Greg Morton as Sergeant Reed, Dr. Roosevelt, Vandel Headhunter
- Chris Ward as Vandel Crash, Cecil, Ralph (in Into the Wilderness)

== Crew ==
- Stu Rosen - Voice Director

== Episode guide ==
No.	Title	Written by	Original release date
1	"Crime Wave"	Rich Fogel and Mark Seidenberg	October 1, 1988
Dr. McNamara hires a very dangerous gang, the Vandals, to cause mass crime waves in Old Detroit. If RoboCop cannot stop this threat, Dr. McNamara will unleash his ED-260 weapon on the streets of Old Detroit.
2	"Scrambler"	Rich Fogel and Mark Seidenberg	October 8, 1988
A former OCP member, now a criminal, hacks into RoboCop's controls system and escapes from prison with help from a brainwashed RoboCop. The criminals proceed to control RoboCop and give him a mission to assassinate OCP’s leader, The Old Man.
3	"Project Deathspore"	Donald F. Glut	October 15, 1988
OCP's experiment Project Deathspore goes terribly wrong. It escapes into the sewers and streets of Old Detroit and feeds on the energy of the city and RoboCop's power.
4	"The Brotherhood"	John Shirley	October 22, 1988
RoboCop meets a Ku-Klux-Klan-like high tech criminal gang who call themselves "The Brotherhood". Their goal is to destroy all robots and cyborgs in Old Detroit with a high tech ball that causes errors in robots and cyborg programming.
5	"The Man in the Iron Suit"	Rich Fogel and Mark Seidenberg	October 29, 1988
Dr. McNamara creates an iron suit that is designed to be far superior to RoboCop. He gets Lieutenant Hedgecock into the suit to challenge RoboCop and prove to the Old Man that his product is far superior. The Old Man is only concerned about which product would be most profitable so he has Hedgecock and RoboCop compete to determine which product is more valuable.
6	"The Hot Seat"	Marv Wolfman	November 5, 1988
Dr. McNamara frees the Vandals from prison and hires them to steal RoboCop’s charging chair; without it, RoboCop is a piece of junk. The Vandals get RoboCop’s chair and try to sell it to Dr. McNamara.
7	"No News Is Good News"	John Shirley	November 12, 1988
Dr. McNamara sabotages OCP's new tank, the AW7 to make it attack the people of Old Detroit. A corrupt reporter attempts to "defame" RoboCop, but faces a number of obstacles in the process.
8	"Night of the Archer"	Michael Charles Hill	November 19, 1988
RoboCop investigates a man named Archer, who plays Robin Hood as he steals from the rich and gives his bounty to the poor of Old Detroit. Inciting violence across Delta City, rioters begin looting and burning down stores and malls as reparations for what OCP's construction and pollution has done to Detroit. Lewis is in a moral crisis unable to connect the Archer's message to the violent actions of rioters, which includes the attempted murder of The Old Man.
9	"Rumble in Old Detroit"	Donald F. Glut	November 26, 1988
A gang war breaks out when a cache of illegal weapons is stolen from Metro West Police Station. Gangs attack gangs and the only one that can stop the violence is RoboCop. And more a former gang member are disabled of his leg, since in a gang war that injured him.
10	"A Robot's Revenge"	John Shirley	December 3, 1988
RoboCop and Anne Lewis are assigned to protect Middle Eastern leaders Prince Zoras and Ilmar as they draft a peace treaty. Two terrorists send an ED-260 to assassinate the two leaders.
11	"Into the Wilderness"	Roger Slifer	December 10, 1988
RoboCop investigates an OCP factory that is polluting the water and environment.
12	"Menace of the Mind"	Roger Slifer	December 17, 1988
Dangerous micro-circuit amulets turn up on the black market. RoboCop discovers that the one distributing them is Clarence Boddicker, the man responsible for Alex Murphy's death. This episode also features Ace Jackson, Wheels Wilson and Birdman Barnes, the three members of RoboCop's Ultra Police team.

== Home media ==
In 1991, three episodes of the series were released as individual NTSC VHS volumes, distributed by Best Film & Video Corp. under the "Marvel Video!" banner. The episodes were: "Man in the Iron Suit!" (volume 1), "Crime Wave" (volume 2), and "A Robot's Revenge" (volume 3).

In the UK, Leisure View Video released two VHS volumes of Robocop. In 1990, they released a volume entitled "Detroit Crimewave" which had the episodes; "Scrambler", "The Brotherhood" and "The Man in the Iron Suit", plus UK toy commercials for Kenner's "Robocop and the Ultra Police" toy line shown in-between each episode.. In 1991, they released a volume entitled "Steel Warrior" which has the episodes; "No News is Good News" and "A Robot's Revenge". This volume had no commercials.

=== DVD release ===
==== United Kingdom ====
In the 2000s, Maximum Entertainment (under license from Jetix Europe) released several DVDs of RoboCop on Region 2 DVD in the UK. On February 18, 2008, UK distributor Maximum Entertainment released the complete series in a three-disc box set containing all 12 episodes.

Title	Episodes	Region 1	Region 2	Region 4	Notes
RoboCop - Volume 1	1–5	-	30 August 2004	-	
Action Man/RoboCop/Conan the Adventurer	6–8	-	20 September 2004	-	
RoboCop - Volume 2 (The Hot Seat)	6–7 and 11	-	4 April 2005	-	
RoboCop - Part Man, Part Machine	1-5	-	4 June 2007	-	
Transformers/MASK/RoboCop	1-5	-	16 July 2007	-	
RoboCop - The Complete Series	1-12	-	11 February 2008	-	
