= RoboCop (soundtrack) =

RoboCop: Original Motion Picture Soundtrack

Soundtrack album by Basil Poledouris
- Released: 1987; July 17, 2015 (Milan release)
- Recorded: May 13, 21-23 and 28, 1987
- Genre: Film score
- Length: 41:49; 56:16 (2015 release)
- Labels: Varèse Sarabande; Milan Records (2015)
- Producer: Basil Poledouris

Basil Poledouris chronology
Iron Eagle (1986)	RoboCop: Original Motion Picture Soundtrack (1987)	No Man's Land (1987)

RoboCop chronology
RoboCop (1987)	RoboCop 2 (1990)

Professional ratings
Review scores
Source	Rating
AllMusic	4/5 stars

RoboCop: Original Motion Picture Soundtrack is the soundtrack to the 1987 film of the same name, composed by Basil Poledouris and performed by the Sinfonia of London. Poledouris previously worked with director Paul Verhoeven on the 1985 film Flesh and Blood. The score combines synthesizers and orchestral music, reflecting RoboCop's cyborg nature. The soundtrack was released by Varèse Sarabande in 1987. An expanded version was released by Milan Records on July 17, 2015. The soundtrack does not contain the PTP song "Show Me Your Spine" that plays during the club scene. This song was later included on the compilation album Side Trax.

== Track listing ==
=== 1987 Varèse Sarabande release ===
Side A
No.	Title	Length
1.	"Main Title"	0:32
2.	"Van Chase"	4:50
3.	"Murphy's Death"	2:30
4.	"Rock Shop"	3:38
5.	"Home"	4:05
6.	"Robo vs. ED-209"	2:00
7.	"The Dream"	3:00

Side B
No.	Title	Length
1.	"Across the Board"	2:28
2.	"Betrayal"	2:12
3.	"Clarence Frags Bob"	1:40
4.	"Drive to Jones' Office"	1:40
5.	"We Killed You"	1:30
6.	"Directive IV"	1:00
7.	"Robo Tips His Hat"	2:00
8.	"Showdown"	5:00

2003 CD bonus tracks
No.	Title	Length
16.	"Have a Heart"	0:31
17.	"OCP Monitors"	1:15
18.	"Nuke 'Em"	0:26
19.	"Big Is Better"	0:27

=== 2010 Intrada Records and the 2015 Milan Records reissue release(s) ===
No.	Title	Length
1.	"Main Title"	0:48
2.	"Have a Heart"	0:34
3.	"OCP Monitors"	1:44
4.	"Twirl"	0:38
5.	"Van Chase"	4:59
6.	"Murphy Dies"	2:38
7.	"Robo Lives"	1:07
8.	"Drive Montage"	1:07
9.	"Helpless Woman"	1:19
10.	"Nukem"	0:29
11.	"Murphy's Dream"	3:08
12.	"Gas Station Blow-Up"	1:46
13.	"Murphy Goes Home"	4:17
14.	"Clarence Frags Bob"	1:47
15.	"Rock Shop"	3:45
16.	"Robo Drives to Jones"	1:49
17.	"Directive IV"	1:06
18.	"Robo & ED-209 Fight"	2:12
19.	"Force Shoots Robo"	2:46
20.	"Big Is Better"	2:36
21.	"Care Package"	3:00
22.	"Looking for Me"	5:16
23.	"Across the Board / End Credits"	7:35
Total length:		56:16

== Personnel ==
- Basil Poledouris – composer, album producer
- Steven Scott Smalley – orchestration
- Derek Austin - synthesizers
- Tom Villano - music editor
- Howard Blake and Tony Britton – conductors
- Eric Tomlinson – recording engineer
- Dan Wallin – balance engineer
- Peter Willson – orchestra manager
- Tom Null - album sequence producer
- Richard Kraft - executive producer
