= RoboCop 3 (soundtrack) =

RoboCop 3: Original Motion Picture Soundtrack

Soundtrack album by Basil Poledouris
- Released: 1993; September 19, 2016 (Deluxe Edition)
- Recorded: February, 1992
- Genre: Film score
- Length: 28:31; 69:08 (Deluxe Edition)
- Label: Varèse Sarabande
- Producer: Basil Poledouris

Basil Poledouris chronology
Free Willy (1993)	RoboCop 3: Original Motion Picture Soundtrack (1993)	On Deadly Ground (1994)

RoboCop chronology
RoboCop 2 (1987)	RoboCop 3 (1993)	A Future to This Life: Robocop – The Series Soundtrack (1995)

Professional ratings
Review scores
Source	Rating
AllMusic	3.5/5 stars

RoboCop 3: Original Motion Picture Soundtrack is the soundtrack to the film of the same name, composed and conducted by Basil Poledouris, performed by the Hollywood Studio Symphony and released by Varèse Sarabande in 1993. An expanded version of the soundtrack was released on September 19, 2016.

== Track listing ==
1993 release
No.	Title	Length
1.	"Main Title / The Resistance"	2:36
2.	"Robo Saves Lewis"	3:57
3.	"Resistance Base"	1:37
4.	"Otomo Underground"	1:52
5.	"Murphy's Memories"	4:38
6.	"Robo Fights Otomo"	4:29
7.	"Nikko and Murphy"	1:54
8.	"Death of Lewis"	3:49
9.	"Sayonara, McDaggit"	3:39
Total length:		28:31

2016 Deluxe Edition
No.	Title	Length
1.	"Delta City / Media Break / Nikko"	1:45
2.	"Main Title / The Resistance / The Searchlight"	3:43
3.	"Gateway"	1:46
4.	"Police Alert / Robo Pack / Response / Armory Escape"	1:46
5.	"Van Chase I"	1:45
6.	"RoboCop in Pursuit / RoboCop Saves Lewis"	4:34
7.	"Flame Job / Nikko Remembers / Kanemitsu Building"	2:30
8.	"Robo Recalls / Murphy, Is It You?"	3:12
9.	"Death of Lewis"	5:10
10.	"Underground / Tracking Beacon / Bertha to Base"	1:40
11.	"O.C.P. / Otomo / Otomo Exits"	0:51
12.	"Refuge"	1:36
13.	"Nikko at Station / Otomo Meets Resistance"	2:35
14.	"Van Approach / Robo Awakens"	1:10
15.	"Nikko and Robo"	2:00
16.	"The Map / Unfinished Business"	1:34
17.	"Robo Torches Rehabs / It's Not a Robo Knock / Robo Visits McDaggit"	3:36
18.	"Van Chase II"	2:36
19.	"Rehab Raid"	2:34
20.	"Good Cops Revolt / Johnny Rehab Commercial"	1:40
21.	"Nikko to O.C.P."	1:51
22.	"Cops Help Rebels / Robo vs. Otomo"	5:13
23.	"Finding the Flight Pack"	1:03
24.	"Robo Flies / Rehabs Chase Marie"	1:44
25.	"Sayonara McDaggit"	3:20
26.	"End Credits"	7:54
Total length:		69:08
