= Statue of RoboCop =

Sculpture in Detroit, Michigan

- RoboCop statue in 2025
- Artists: Rob Bottin; Mark Dubeau; Giorgio Gikas; Jay Jurma; Nadine Chronopolous; Venus Bronze Works
- Completion date: 2025
- Medium: Bronze
- Subject: RoboCop
- Dimensions: 3.4 m (11 ft)
- Weight: 2.5 short tons (2.3 t)
- Location: Detroit, Michigan, U.S.; 42.3511616°N 83.0434878°W 13353736933 RoboCop statue on OpenStreetMap
- Website: easternmarket.org/robo-cop-statue/

The statue of RoboCop is a bronze statue located in Eastern Market, Detroit depicting RoboCop, a fictional cybernetically enhanced Detroit Police Department officer from the eponymous 1987 film.

The idea for the statue originated with a 2011 exchange between Detroit mayor Dave Bing and a pseudonymous user on Twitter. In response to the suggestion that Detroit have a statue of RoboCop to rival Philadelphia's statue of Rocky, Bing replied that there were no plans to erect such a statue in the city. The exchange went viral and a subsequent Kickstarter campaign raised $67,436 to fund the construction of the statue.

Completion and installation of the statue was significantly delayed due to several setbacks, including difficulties in securing a site, legal issues with MGM, and artist Giorgio Gikas battling cancer. The statue was completed in 2017 and installed in 2025.

== Origin ==
MT
(@MT)
tweeted:

@mayordavebing Philadelphia has a statue of Rocky & Robocop would kick Rocky's butt. He's a GREAT ambassador for Detroit.

February 7, 2011

Dave Bing
(@mayordavebing)
tweeted:

@MT There are not any plans to erect a statue to Robocop. Thank you for the suggestion.

February 7, 2011

In early 2011, Detroit mayor Dave Bing and his communications team solicited suggestions on Twitter for improvements to the city. On February 7, 2011, User @MT responded "Philadelphia has a statue of Rocky & Robocop would kick Rocky's butt. He's a GREAT ambassador for Detroit." (Note: Philadelphia's statue of Rocky Balboa from the film Rocky has at various times been on display near the Rocky Steps outside of the Philadelphia Museum of Art.) Bing replied to the tweet, writing "There are not any plans to erect a statue to Robocop. Thank you for the suggestion."

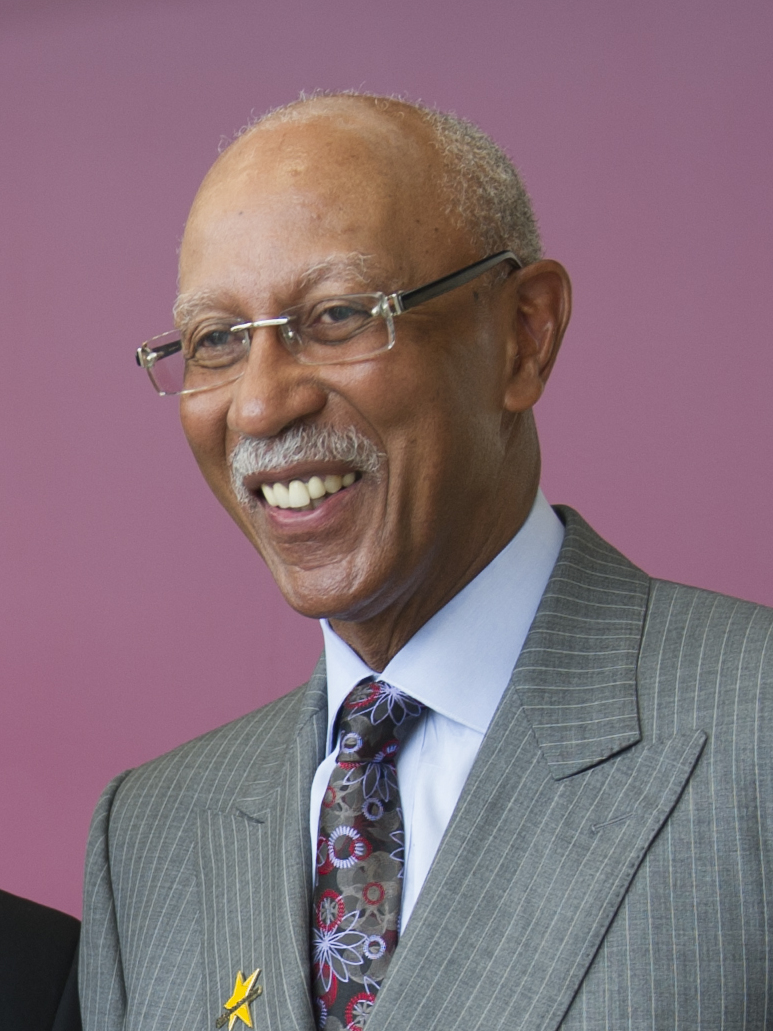
Detroit Mayor Dave Bing

The exchange between the mayor and the user, who was identified as a "random dude in Massachusetts", quickly went viral on Twitter. Within a day, RoboCop was on the front page of Reddit, a 'Build a Robocop Statue in Detroit' Facebook group had been started, and a Kickstarter campaign was launched to fund the creation of the statue. Articles about the RoboCop statue were written up in Reuters, Gizmodo, TMZ, and Jalopnik.

Starting with a goal of $50,000, the crowdfunding campaign on Kickstarter raised $67,436 from 2,718 people in six days. A $25,000 donation came from graphic designer Pete Hottelet of Omni Consumer Products, an entertainment licensing firm named after the fictional corporation that constructs RoboCop in the film. Within the week, "RoboCop" became one of the most-searched terms on Yahoo!

Actor Peter Weller, who portrayed RoboCop in RoboCop and RoboCop 2, recorded a video for Funny or Die that was released on March 14, 2011. In the video, Weller jokingly calls out Mayor Bing for deeming the RoboCop statue "silly". Weller also appeared in a video for RoboCharity, which was established by the Detroit foodbank Forgotten Harvest.

The prospect of a statue of RoboCop in Detroit was mildly controversial. Critics pointed to Detroit's portrayal in the RoboCop films as a "lawless hellscape" run by an evil corporation, reinforcing the city's image as "Hollywood's default example of urban decay". Others saw the statue as a waste of money, memorializing a fictional character while important projects in the city go unfunded. A Crain's Detroit Business headline declared "This is what happens when irony runs amok". Later in 2020, the murder of George Floyd and the ensuing protests called into question the symbolism of erecting a statue dedicated to a police officer (even if the police officer was a fictional cyborg).

== Design and construction ==
Having secured funding for the RoboCop statue, the organizers of the Kickstarter campaign, Jerry Paffendorf, Brandon Walley, Mary Carter, Pete Hottelet, John Leonard, and Alex Languirand began determining the material that would be used for the statue, locating and selecting a foundry, beginning discussions about licensing rights, and determining where the statue would eventually be located. The original post on Kickstarter envisioned a seven-foot-tall iron statue based on a 3D scan of a RoboCop action figure. Through the help of Mark Dubeau from Tippett Studio, the original armor by Rob Bottin was located in a warehouse in Houston, TX. Dubeau created molds from this original armor in a partnership with Fred Barton Productions, who was creating licensed busts at the time. All work was approved by MGM. The life-size armor restoration was 3D scanned at Across the Board Creations and digitally scaled to result in the 10-foot height of the figure. Foam forms were produced for the final casting following remilling at a west coast facility.

The Detroit-based sculptural restoration firm Venus Bronze Works was selected to create the RoboCop statue. Owner and sculpture conservator Giorgio Gikas has restored numerous monuments in Detroit, including The Spirit of Detroit, The Fist, and the Victory and Progress chariot at the Wayne County Building. Gikas was born in Greece and worked at Roman Bronze Works before moving to Detroit.

Foam forms for the statue arrived in Detroit in September 2013. In order to melt the bronze for the statue, a furnace had to be purchased. The last major molds were poured and completed in October 2016. In the summer of 2020, as the Venus Bronze Works crew was placing the pelvis of the statue onto its legs, the statue was found to be leaning back. In order to correct the tilt, a slice of RoboCop's torso was shaved off and a plate was welded in.

The 11-foot (3.4 m) tall, 2.5-short-ton (2.3 t) bronze statue is welded to a stainless steel base that weighs half a ton. According to an employee at Venus Bronze Works, the legs and pelvis of the statue are tied to metal shafts which go into phalanges in the bottom. The base connects to lead pipes which can be dropped into holes on the base and filled with epoxy to keep the statue from moving when the ground freezes. The statue's kneecaps alone each weigh about 25 pounds (11 kg). A dark gray patina was used in the finishing of the statue. The statue was welded by Nick Phlegar and Mike Birtles.

The RoboCop statue does not depict RoboCop's gun—a Beretta M93R Auto 9, which could plausibly be hidden in his internal leg holster. Instead the statue portrays RoboCop in "an inviting and approachable gesture" with his left hand extending outwards, "as opposed to being armed and threatening."

== Site selection and delays ==
There were multiple setbacks during the construction and site location of the RoboCop statue. The projected completion and public unveiling of the RoboCop statue were repeatedly been announced or predicted in the years since the project's conception. During the construction of the statue, Venus Bronze Works owner Gikas was diagnosed with colon cancer. He was sick for one and a half years before recovering.

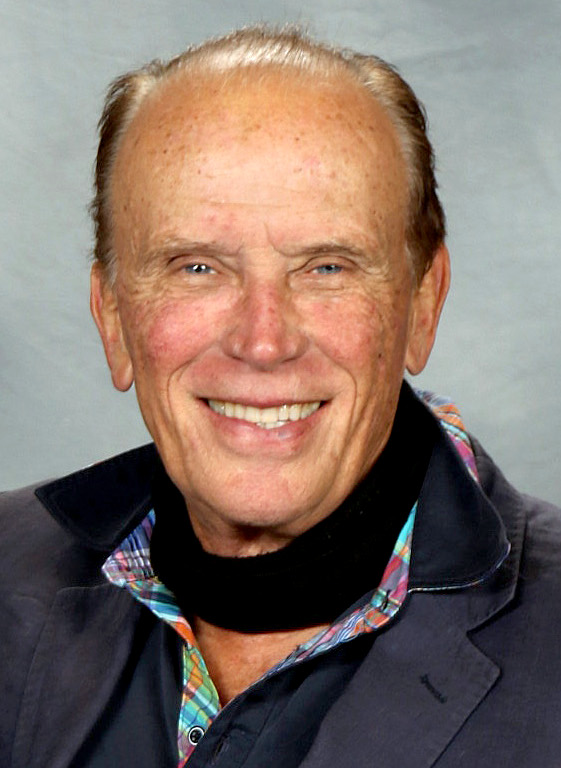
Actor Peter Weller portrayed RoboCop in RoboCop and RoboCop 2

A planned unveiling of the sculpture was expected to occur on June 3, 2014, which was declared "RoboCop Day" in Detroit. While the unveiling and an event at the Detroit Public Safety Headquarters were cancelled, an actor dressed as RoboCop did throw out the ceremonial first pitch at a Detroit Tigers game at Comerica Park. In March 2017, the Chicago firm Skidmore, Owings & Merrill included RoboCop in a rendering of a plan for the Detroit RiverFront Conservancy. Speculation that the statue would be placed on the east riverfront was dashed when the firm said that it was a joke. The statue was predicted to be finished in 2018 and placed somewhere downtown. An article in Popular Mechanics announced the statue would be finished in March 2020.

Multiple locations were suggested for the placement of the RoboCop statue. Initially, the statue was planned to be located at Roosevelt Park, near Michigan Central Station. Belle Isle was mentioned as a possible site for the statue, as was Wayne State University's TechTown campus. In May 2018 it was announced that the Michigan Science Center would be the site of the RoboCop statue. Later in 2021, the science center bowed out, citing the COVID-19 pandemic. An offer from the mayor of Stevens Point, Wisconsin, to have that city as a home for the statue was rejected by Brandon Walley. The mayor vowed to make an even larger RoboCop statue, possibly through 3D printing and funded through an initiative by a local Commodore 64 club.

The likeness of RoboCop is owned by Metro-Goldwyn-Mayer. Legal issues with the film studio held up the public display of the statue. According to Dan Carmody of Eastern Market Corp., a definitive legal agreement had not been reached as of November 2022. The RoboCop statue was stored at an undisclosed location in the Eastern Market. Constructing a foundation for the statue and moving it into place were estimated to cost tens of thousands of dollars.

The statue debuted on December 3, 2025, standing outside 3434 Russell St., just south of Mack Ave in Detroit's Eastern Market.
