= List of RoboCop video games =

RoboCop is a video game series based on the RoboCop films. The games were released on various platforms by several companies since 1988.

== RoboCop ==
RoboCop is a run and gun and beat 'em up hybrid arcade game developed and published by Data East. The player controls RoboCop, who advances through various stages adapted from the 1987 film. The bonus screen is a target shooting range in a first-person perspective. The intermission features digitized voices from the actors. RoboCop was licensed to Data East by UK-based Ocean Software, which had licensed it from Orion Pictures during the script stage.

== RoboCop 2 ==
RoboCop 2 is a side-scrolling platform game for Amiga, GX4000, Atari ST, Commodore 64, Game Boy, Nintendo Entertainment System, and ZX Spectrum. Ocean Software developed and published several versions, and Data East made an arcade version.

== RoboCop 3 ==
RoboCop 3 is a 1991 video game developed by Digital Image Design and published by Ocean for the Amiga. It features multiple gameplay styles. During 1992 and 1993, other versions consisting of side-scrolling platform gameplay were released for the Atari ST, Commodore 64, Game Gear, Nintendo Entertainment System (NES), Sega Genesis, Super Nintendo Entertainment System (SNES), and ZX Spectrum. The SNES version has what many considered to be extremely difficult gameplay. It was largely critically panned upon release. Flying Edge (a subsidiary of Acclaim Entertainment) later published this version for the Sega Mega Drive/Genesis, Master System, and Game Gear.

== RoboCop Versus The Terminator ==
RoboCop Versus The Terminator was released for several platforms and based on the RoboCop and Terminator franchises.

In the future, human soldiers of John Connor's resistance force against the machines are fighting a losing war against Skynet and its robot forces. Discovering that one of the foundation technologies for Skynet is the cybernetics technology used in the creation of cyborg police officer RoboCop, Flo, a resistance soldier, is sent back in time to destroy RoboCop and stop Skynet from being built. However, Skynet learns of the time travel attempt and sends Terminators to stop Flo.

The player controls RoboCop, who may move across the screen, jump, fire and exchange weapons. RoboCop starts with the Auto-9 which has unlimited ammunition. Other weapons may be more powerful and carry unlimited ammunition. Beginning the game on a mission of law enforcement, RoboCop soon meets up with Flo and must engage in battle against Terminators, the forces of OCP and several obstacles. Upon discovering one of the Terminators has infiltrated the OCP building, RoboCop plugs himself into a console to reprogram the security, only to fall into a trap and be digitized. After his body is disassembled and used for building Skynet, RoboCop watches Skynet come to power before using his digitized mind to seize control of an abandoned robotics factory, rebuild himself, and begin to destroy Skynet in the future.

== RoboCop (2001) ==
In 1999, Titus Software acquired the rights for RoboCop video games. By 2001, Titus had begun development of a RoboCop game for the Game Boy Color (GBC) and Game Boy Advance (GBA), with an expected release in the fourth quarter of 2001. The GBA version features identical gameplay to the 1988 RoboCop game. The GBC version was released later that year. In May 2002, Titus unveiled more screenshots of the GBA version, which was expected for release in October 2002, but the game was ultimately canceled.

== RoboCop (2003) ==
RoboCop was developed and published by Titus in 2003, for Microsoft Windows, PlayStation 2, and Xbox. The following year, Titus released a GameCube version in Japan, titled RoboCop: Aratanaru Kiki (ロボコップ 〜新たなる危機〜, RoboKoppu 〜Aratanaru Kiki〜; lit. "RoboCop: New Crisis"). The player controls RoboCop to uncover a sinister plot involving OCP, local gangsters dealing a deadly new synthetic drug and a powerful cyborg known only as MIND. As a last hope, RoboCop must capture, destroy, or arrest hostile characters in a desperate search for clues and evidence. The Xbox version received "unfavorable" reviews according to the review aggregation website Metacritic.

== RoboCop (2004) ==
RoboCop is a side-scrolling action platform game. It was released for mobile phones and is based on the 1987 film, featuring RoboCop as he attempts to stop Clarence Boddicker and his gang. Developer Digital Bridges announced the game in May 2004, as part of an agreement with Metro-Goldwyn-Mayer to produce video games based on the studio's film franchises. RoboCop was released in North America in October 2004. IGN rated the game 8.5 out of 10, praising the graphics and music.

== RoboCop - The Official Game (2014) ==
RoboCop - The Official Game (stylized as RoboCop - _THE OFFICIAL GAME, also simply known as RoboCop) is a 2014 free-to-play shooter game developed and published by Glu Mobile for iOS and Android. The game is a tie-in to the 2014 RoboCop remake film, although with a different plot in which RoboCop fights against holographic enemies and robots in a training simulation. RoboCop - The Official Game is played as a third-person shooter. RoboCop can use various weapons throughout the game's missions, and can also take cover behind objects. RoboCop was in a soft launch phase in Canada as of October 2013. The game was released for iOS on January 7, 2014, and the Android version was released on January 15, prior to the film's release in February 2014.

RoboCop - The Official Game received "mixed or average reviews" according to Metacritic. Some reviewers criticized the game's free-to-play aspects. Slide to Play, while praising the game's cover system, was critical of "some of the most aggressive attempts at monetization that we've seen yet", stating that the game's "best weapons are enormously expensive, and some premium weapons cost over $100 in in-app purchases". It stated that the game was fun by focusing on its progression and action while ignoring the microtransactions. TouchArcade wrote that the game "suffers greatly" from the free-to-play elements, but praised the gameplay, graphics, sounds, and controls, stating that "It's probably one of the more competent Robocop games ever made, actually." Pete Davison of USgamer called it a "technically impressive but shallow, derivative, money-hungry waste of time", stating that, "Being a freemium mobile game, Robocop comes with all the annoyances we've come to expect." Steven Burns of VideoGamer.com considered the game to be boring and repetitive, while stating that the free-to-play aspect "negatively affects what little gameplay is there".

Peter Willington of Pocket Gamer praised the game as "quick to understand, and simple to play", but criticized it as repetitive, ultimately calling it "competent but forgettable". Alex de Vore of Gamezebo praised the graphics but criticized the "boring, needless dialog" and the "utterly forgettable" music, and concluded, "Everything from the boring shooting to the lack of any real control just reeks of a rush job." IGN called the game "formulaic and forgettable".

== RoboCop: Rogue City (2023) ==
RoboCop: Rogue City is a first-person shooter game developed by Teyon and published by Nacon. The game was released for PlayStation 5, Windows, and Xbox Series X/S on 2 November 2023. It is based on the original trilogy of films as an all-new adventure about the future of law enforcement. Peter Weller reprised his role as RoboCop. The official port for Nintendo Switch was quietly canceled.
