= RoboCop 2 =

1990 film by Irvin Kershner

- Theatrical release poster
- Directed by: Irvin Kershner
- Screenplay by: Frank Miller; Walon Green
- Story by: Frank Miller
- Based on: Characters by: Edward Neumeier; Michael Miner
- Produced by: Jon Davison
- Starring: Peter Weller; Nancy Allen; Daniel O'Herlihy; Tom Noonan; Belinda Bauer; Gabriel Damon
- Cinematography: Mark Irwin
- Edited by: William Anderson; Deborah Zeitman; Lee Smith; Armen Minasian
- Music by: Leonard Rosenman
- Distributed by: Orion Pictures
- Release date: June 22, 1990
- Running time: 117 minutes
- Country: United States
- Language: English
- Budget: $25–30 million
- Box office: $45.7 million

RoboCop 2 is a 1990 American science-fiction action film directed by Irvin Kershner and written by Frank Miller and Walon Green. It stars Peter Weller, Nancy Allen, Dan O'Herlihy, Belinda Bauer, Tom Noonan, and Gabriel Damon. It is the sequel to the 1987 film RoboCop, the second installment in the RoboCop franchise and the last to feature Weller as RoboCop until he returned in Mortal Kombat 11 (2019), RoboCop: Rogue City (2023) and other media. It is the last film Kershner directed before his death in 2010.

Set in a dystopian Detroit, the plot follows RoboCop (Weller) as he becomes embroiled in a scheme made by Omni Consumer Products to bankrupt and take over the city, while also fighting the spread of a street drug called "Nuke" and its gang of dealers led by Cain (Noonan). The film was shot in Houston.

The film received mixed reviews upon its release and earned a moderate box-office return, grossing $45 million domestically, compared to the previous film's $53 million gross on a significantly smaller production budget. It was nominated for three Saturn Awards, including Best Science Fiction Film, Best Performance by a Younger Actor (for Damon), and Best Special Effects (for Phil Tippett, Rob Bottin, and Peter Kuran). A sequel, RoboCop 3, was released in 1993. Miller returned to write the comic-book sequel RoboCop Versus the Terminator in 1992 and Steven Grant adapted his original screenplays for the second and third films into the comics Frank Miller's RoboCop from 2003 to 2006 and 2013 to 2014.

== Plot ==
Detroit is facing bankruptcy after failing to pay off its debts to conglomerate Omni Consumer Products (OCP). The OCP chairman intends to have the city default on its debt, then foreclose on all public property, so they may move ahead with their radical urban development project, Delta City. (Note: As established in RoboCop) To rally public opinion behind the project, OCP deliberately underfunds the Detroit Police Department to cause a rise in street crime. A new drug, Nuke, is sweeping the city, driven by crime boss Cain and his lieutenant, a teenaged boy named Hob.

RoboCop remains on duty with his partner Anne Lewis and continues to be plagued by memories of his life as Alex Murphy. He locates the home of his widow and son, and begins watching them until she brings litigation against OCP, but when she meets him face-to-face and is responsive to him, RoboCop claims not to know her and that her husband is dead. OCP attempts to develop a "RoboCop 2" using the brains of legally dead police officers, intending to mass produce them to replace human officers, but all subjects kill themselves upon activation. Psychologist Juliette Faxx suggests that the error is the test subjects, and that Murphy was a success because of his strict Catholic upbringing and moral code, preventing him from committing suicide and reinforcing his devotion to his duty. Faxx begins screening suitable candidates for the project, but instead of police officers, she secretly considers death row inmates who desire power and immortality.

RoboCop raids a construction site used by Cain's gang, but he is ambushed and dismembered, and the pieces are dumped in front of the precinct. RoboCop is repaired, but Faxx intentionally reprograms him with more than 300 new directives that severely impede his ability to perform his duties, so that her project can be selected. RoboCop eventually clears these by shocking himself with a high-voltage transformer and rebooting his system. He rallies the police to assist in raiding Cain's hideout. After a battle and chase, Cain is wounded, arrested, and falls into a coma. Hob escapes and takes control of his empire.

Believing she can control Cain via his Nuke addiction, Faxx selects him for the RoboCop 2 project and disconnects his life support. His brain is removed and implanted in a new cyborg body. Hob contacts the mayor and offers to cover the city's debt to OCP in exchange for leniency towards their drugs syndicate. OCP sends RoboCop 2 to stop the deal. At the meeting, RoboCop 2 kills everyone present except for the mayor, who escapes alive, and Hob. RoboCop arrives and is told by a fatally wounded Hob that Cain is now RoboCop 2 and was responsible for the killings.

At an unveiling ceremony for RoboCop 2 and Delta City, RoboCop 2 goes out of control and berserk when the OCP chairman holds up a canister of Nuke. RoboCop arrives, and along with the police, ineffectually battles RoboCop 2 as it attacks civilians. Lewis uses an armored car and Nuke to distract it, while RoboCop climbs on its back, rips out its brain, and smashes it on the street, deactivating the machine. The OCP chairman uses Faxx as the scapegoat for the failure of RoboCop 2 and for the civilian and police casualties it caused. Lewis complains that OCP will once again avoid accountability, but RoboCop insists they must be patient because, "we're only human".

== Cast ==
- Peter Weller as Officer Alex Murphy / RoboCop, a cyborg police officer
- Nancy Allen as Officer Anne Lewis, RoboCop's partner
- Belinda Bauer as Dr. Juliette Faxx, a psychologist working for OCP
- Dan O'Herlihy as "The Old Man", the CEO of OCP
- Felton Perry as Donald Johnson, the Old Man's wise lieutenant and the director of operations for OCP
- Tom Noonan as Cain / RoboCop 2, the leader of the Nuke drug cartel
- Willard E. Pugh as Marvin Kuzak, the corrupt Mayor of Detroit
- Gabriel Damon as Hob, a young boy who is allied with Cain
- Galyn Görg as Angie, Cain's lover and possibly his second-in-command
- Stephen Lee as Officer Duffy, a corrupt police officer
- Robert DoQui as Sergeant Warren Reed
- Ken Lerner as Tom Delaney
- Jeff McCarthy as Holzgang
- John Doolittle as Schenk
- Angie Bolling as Ellen Murphy, Alex Murphy's widow
- Brandon Smith as Flint
- Wallace Merck as Gun Shop Owner
- Thomas Rosales Jr. as Chet, leader of the gun store robbers
- Carl Ciarfalio as An Unnamed Gun Store Robber
- Tzi Ma as Tak Akita, a laboratory technician
- Wanda De Jesus as Officer Estevez
- George Cheung as Gilette, one of Cain's goons
- Phil Rubenstein as Poulos
- Michael Medeiros as Catzo, one of Cain's high-ranking goons
- Roger Aaron Brown as Officer Whittaker
- Mark Rolston as Officer Stef
- Gary Bullock as A Hack Doctor
- Linda Thompson as A Mother With Baby
- John Glover as Magnavolt Salesman
- Mario Machado as Casey Wong
- Leeza Gibbons as Jess Perkins
- John Ingle as Surgeon General
- Fabiana Udenio as Sunblock Woman
- Barry Martin as An Unnamed OCP Cop
- Patricia Charbonneau as Linda Garcia (uncredited), a laboratory technician
- Frank Miller as Frank (uncredited)
- Jerry L. Nelson as Darren Thomas (credited as Jerry Nelson)

== Production ==
=== 1987–1988: The Corporate Wars ===
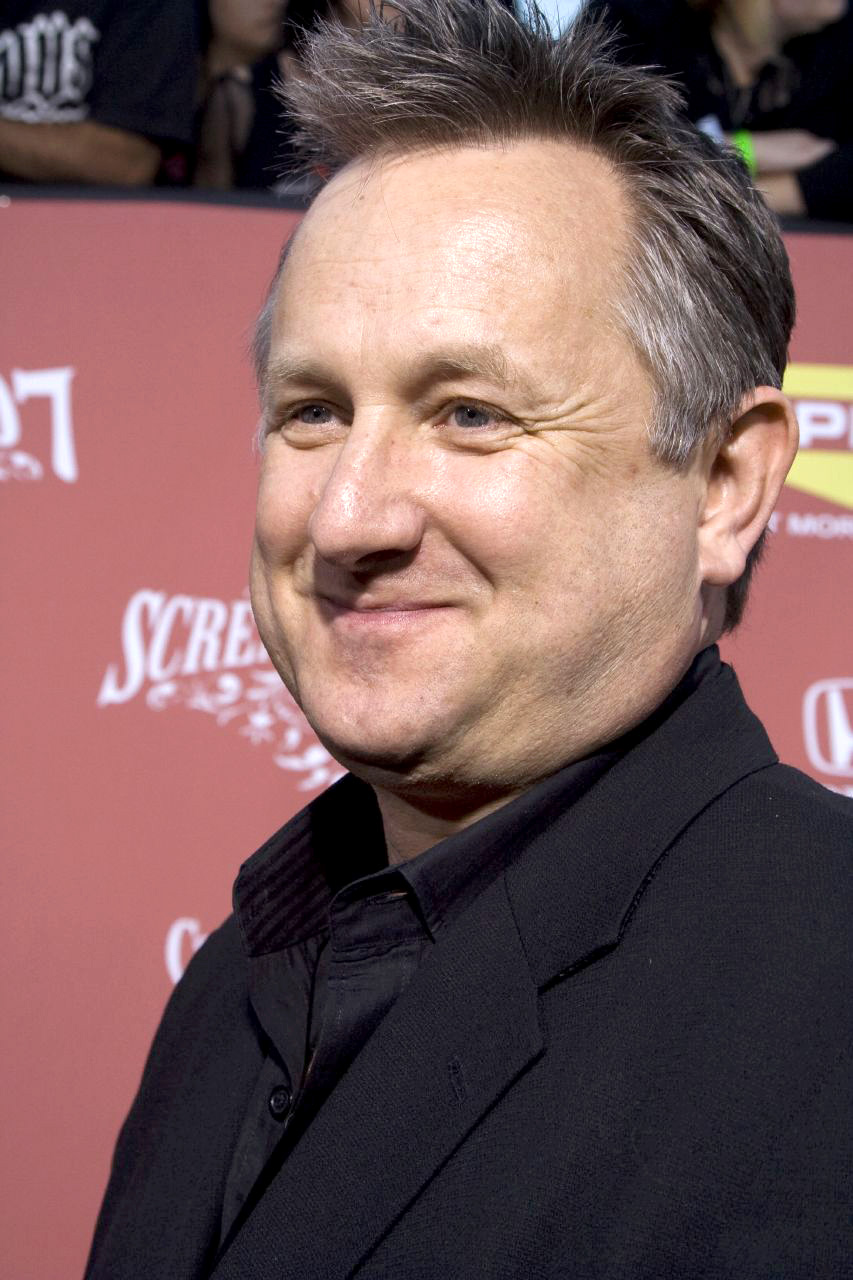
Edward Neumeier in 2007. As a result of a five-month Writer's Guild strike and a difficulty to agree with Orion on a story, Michael Miner and he were fired from the project.

RoboCop screenwriters Edward Neumeier and Michael Miner started drafting a sequel in September 1987 due to strong demand by Orion, which imposed a deadline of December 31, 1987. Neumeier and Miner rushed the screenplay as they were also simultaneously writing for another Orion project, Company Man; a film about the Central Intelligence Agency's involvement in the Contras, it was planned to be directed by Oliver Stone, star Paul Newman, and be released before the next United States election.

Neumeier and Miner's draft, RoboCop 2: The Corporate Wars, is set 25 years after the first movie. RoboCop, trying to stop a bank-robbery, is blown up by a thief. The titular protagonist wakes up in a new United States named AmeriPlex, consisting of upper-class "plexes" made out of former cities (e.g. NewYorkPlex, RioPlex, DelhiPlex) and many more shanty towns with residents named OutPlexers. He is revived in a now-abandoned building for the defunct Omni-Consumer Products (OCP) by two goons of a "super-entrepreneur" named Ted Flicker, who plans to make the national government a private corporate entity that he will own. Flicker also currently has a lot of control over the country, despite another person (who was a former comedian) being the president. RoboCop's new system is also the central computer system of AmeriPlex, NeuroBrain.

RoboCop 2 follows numerous subplots, such as Flicker's plan for domination, a violence-spreading narcotic named Smudge, the Internal Grid Security commander trying to commit genocide against the OutPlexers, and RoboCop's code being played with by an American scientist and a Chinese hacker. The script expands upon the first film's consumerist aspects; those in the high-class city plexes eat at LeisureGold where ServiceDroids serve them and make love with SexBots at various brothels; while the environment's media landscape is filled with "NewsBlips", mood-enhancing drugs ads, and MoonDog, a rapper from space, changing public opinion.

On March 7, 1988, a five-month Writers Guild of America strike began and its length resulted in Neumeier and Miner being fired from the project for breach of contract. Additionally, the writers and Orion struggled to agree on a story, with the studio turned off by the gritty parts of Neumeier and Miner's draft. Stone also stopped Company Man to work on Talk Radio (1988), making Neumeier and Miner no longer involved at Orion.

=== 1988–1989: Frank Miller's RoboCop 2 ===
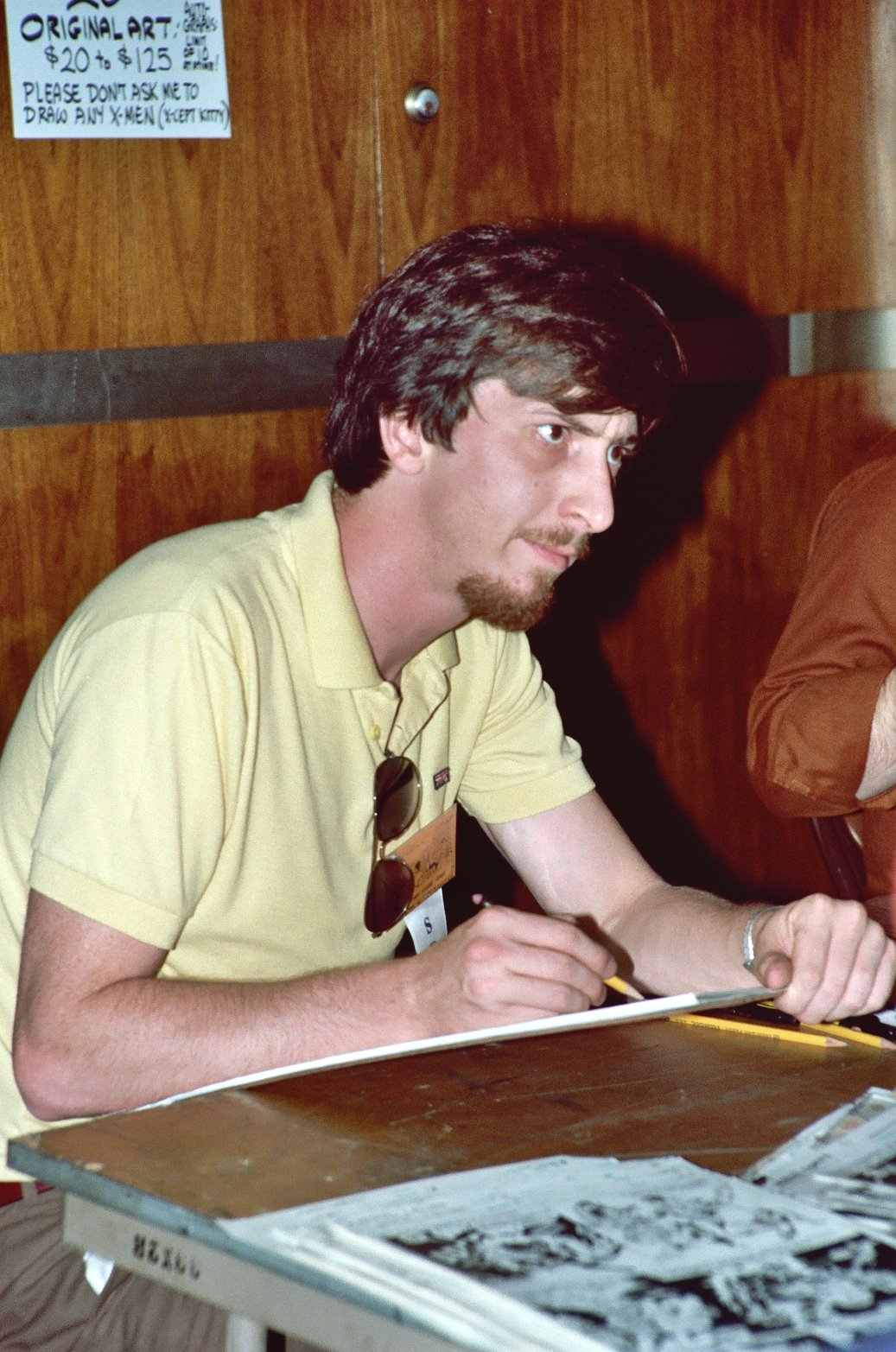
Frank Miller in 1982. His script for RoboCop 2 went through four drafts. He later used an early treatment for a comic book series.

In order for a sequel to still be possible, Orion had to sign a waiver to develop other RoboCop scripts, and, before he was fired, Neumeier recommended two popular comic book authors to write them: Alan Moore and Frank Miller. Moore declined the offer, citing a lack of interest in working on movies. Miller, who had become popular for his edgy, "tragic hero" take on the Batman character, signed on to the project after Miner and Neumeier had been fired. His script went through four drafts. While there had been no reports of Miller taking influence from Neumeier's script, The Corporate Wars, both versions of the script have several things in common, including the concepts of corporate executives trying to buy out entire governments and highly addictive drugs causing mass violence.

Miller's first draft was less comic and had a bigger emphasis on corporatism than the final film, with the last showdown pitting RoboCop against OCP forces instead of RoboCop 2. While RoboCop (1987) producer Jon Davison praised its grittiness, "inventive action", humor, and politics, Orion rejected the script as "unfilmable" and brought in a screenwriter of the violent western film The Wild Bunch (1969), Walon Green, to re-write it. Cut material included backstories for Anne Lewis and the marriage between Alex Murphy and his wife Ellen. Miller later used his treatment as the basis for his own series of RoboCop comics published in the 2000s.

=== Development ===
Davison had been reluctant to produce a sequel to RoboCop, citing a skepticism of sequels in general. He believed that most sequels were worse than their predecessors, and he preferred to cater new properties to audiences of the first film. He was also forced to decide between producing a second RoboCop film, versus producing Warren Beatty's screen adaptation of the Dick Tracy comics. He ultimately chose to take on RoboCop 2, saying that "RoboCop is my movie and Dick Tracy is more Warren's movie". Director Paul Verhoeven did not return, as he was working on Total Recall (1990).

As with the first film, multiple directors rejected offers from Davison to direct RoboCop 2, although for different reasons; Davison reported potentials were either concerned about following up Verhoeven's directing, or not wanting to direct a sequel. Alex Cox considered the project, but changed his mind after watching a screening of the sequel to The Exorcist (1973).

Davison first hired his friend Tim Hunter, mostly known for River's Edge (1986), to direct RoboCop 2, citing his "realistic tone with actors" and "real dark sensibility" as reasons. However, Hunter left the project eleven weeks before filming began, citing a conflict between his vision of an entirely dark product like the first film, and Miller's more humorous script, which he called "tonally unfocused". He was replaced by Irvin Kershner, who had previously filled in as director on The Empire Strikes Back (1980), and who shared Miller's vision.

While Davison had made Kershner agree to not make changes to the script once shooting had begun, due to the state of the script and the tight schedule, Kershner found himself forced to work closely with Miller on editing the script as filming progressed. Kershner added more dialogue and discarded several new scenes that Green had added, in favor of the reworks that he was performing with Miller. Miller later said that he had only been willing to work with Kershner on revising the script, and that he had rejected multiple offers from other people to do this.

Orion Pictures asserted far greater control over the sequel compared to the original film, and frequently pushed back against input from Miller, Kershner, and the actors. Before the story had been completed, Orion announced a release date during the Christmas season in 1989, then later moved it up to early that summer, resulting in a rushed production cycle. Neumeier and Miner claimed that these decisions were based solely on business decisions and stifled creativity, and Weller said that the film did not have a proper third act since Orion insisted that "the monster's going to be enough."

=== Casting ===
Initially, Orion was skeptical of casting Weller, under the reasoning that the audience would find RoboCop the same if another actor was under the helmet, similar to the titular character of Universal's The Mummy. Weller himself was also skeptical coming back; he disliked Neumeier and Miner's draft as a "cartoon" and lacking in tension, felt not "complete with the character" thinking "there was something else to say with it", and wondered if he should do months of training for acting in a RoboCop suit, or get paid for filming in the Caribbean for ten weeks.

Ultimately, Weller returned for Miller and Green's new screenplay, and the fact that he would again work with mime Moni Yakim, who developed RoboCop movements for Weller in the first film; he praised him as the "magic element" to solve all of a crew's problems. Russell Towery returned as Weller's stunt double, with Weller more dependent on him than the first movie.

Allen, despite already having played a cop character in the first RoboCop, still made preparations for shooting RoboCop 2; she learned martial arts and spent two months of training at a Los Angeles police academy. Although Cain was originally planned to be a typical professionally suited drug dealer, his actor, Tom Noonan, came up with the character being a former hippie, with the actor using his experience as one in the 1960s.

=== Filming ===
RoboCop 2 was chiefly filmed in Houston. Kershner mentioned that Houston was an ideal location, due to the relative calmness of Downtown Houston at night. He also claimed that they were shooting in winter, and snow and rain would be an inappropriate climate for film production. Jefferson Davis Hospital was used as the location for the Nuke manufacturing plant; it also served as the exterior of the police station. The finale of the film was shot in the Houston Theater District, near Wortham Theater Center and Alley Theatre.

Cullen Center was depicted as the headquarters of Omni Consumer Products. Houston City Hall was shown in a scene in which Mayor Kuzak speaks to the press. The George R. Brown Convention Center and the Bank of America Center were included in the film. Additional footage was filmed at the decommissioned Hiram Clarke Power Plant.

With Kershner's first few weeks spent storyboarding the visual effects during pre-production, the first month on RoboCop 2 was night shooting, and Vistavision-camera background plates for Phil Tippett's animated special effects of the final battle scenes. A week spent filming a major sequence at an abandoned steel mill established how Kershner would direct the film's other scenes in terms of acting, lighting and camera movements.

The second unit was directed by Conrad Palmisano and mostly shot in Los Angeles, although a stunt sequence by the unit was reported to be filmed near the entrance of the Wortham Theater Center. It got so busy it was unable to produce all the shots Kershner wanted; this meant the director had to film with the unit for a few weeks.

A magazine article published at the time of filming described the environment on set as "hell on earth", with the cast and crew rebelling against Kershner's "obsessive finickyness" and "costly reshoots." However, this was repudiated by Weller who said: "Kersh didn't delay anything, he's very, very instinctive - he had his mind made up, usually ahead of time." Kershner said: "I didn't shoot a lot of film at all. You see, if I'd tried to do a lot of coverage, I would never have finished. I would have been 120 days. I had to pretty much lock it in, piece by piece by piece, giving myself an out here and there, a variation, so I wasn't totally locked in. That way, I could finish. If I didn't do that, this would have gone on forever. I never would have gotten each day's work done."

Although, at the time, Allen praised Kershner for his creativeness and attention to detail, she later criticized the director as antagonistic, and ruining the humor and "heart" of the screenplay. Peter Weller was also critical of the script: "RoboCop 2 didn't have a third act. I told the producers and Irv Kershner up front, and Frank Miller. I told them all. I said, 'Where's the third act here, man? So I beat up a big monster. In the third act, you have to have your Dan O'Herlihy. Somebody's got to be the third act.' 'No, no, the monster's going to be enough.' 'Look, it's not enough!'" Despite the script problem, he enjoyed working on the movie with Kershner: "I had a good time making RoboCop 2 but the script did not have the code, the spine, or the soul of the first one." Noonan also claimed to be "relaxed" and enjoying himself on set, where "everyone was incredibly nice", and found Kershner able to adapt with many location and script changes during shooting.

=== Effects ===
Phil Tippett returned from the first RoboCop to do the visual effects for the sequel, this time leading all the effects units. RoboCop 2 was Tippett and Kershner's second collaboration, after Tippett worked at Industrial Light & Magic for The Empire Strikes Back.

Most of the RoboCop 2 design was created while Hunter was signed as director.

RoboCop suit designer Rob Bottin, although not overseeing the process like in the first film, returned to produce a new suit for the second film. The first suit was dark chrome using metal flake and various green, purple and gold colors to create a look made iridescent and steel-like by Jost Vacano's fluorescent lighting; however, since Mark Irwin replaced Vacano for cinematographer and used conventional lighting, the second film suit (although using a black base like the other suit) looked light-bluer, so iridescent colors were more directly applied with powder. Thanks to a bigger budget, the effects team had more time to paint and polish the suit, which led to Bottin's desired "show car" look he couldn't achieve in the first. With a lot of planning and fastener hunting, Bottin also built all parts of the suit to come on and off quickly so that it couldn't decay from the actor having it on too long, which was the case of the first film.

To create Cain's computer-animated face, Tom Noonan's face was laser-scanned to construct a digital model. The software Perform was used to animate this digital face in real time, except from when Cain's face first emerges through a 'wall' of computer text, where keyframe animation and early computer compositing techniques were employed. For the death scene, deliberate errors were introduced into the raw data of Cain's digital face, creating the appearance of deformation and disintegration during animation. Once the preferred takes were selected, they were rendered on a high-resolution monitor, with each frame taking approximately one second to render. An automatic 35-m.m. movie camera, positioned close to the monitor, captured each frame. The resulting 35-m.m. film was transferred to LaserDisc, allowing Phil Tippett's team to freeze individual frames and advance frame by frame. The LaserDisc signal for each frame was displayed on a C.R.T. screen attached to the stop-motion model of Cain's robotic body, synchronizing them with the body's motion. A movie camera then recorded these synchronized frames.

RoboCop 2 featured similar police cars to the first RoboCop film, using customized Ford Tauruses. However, they did not reuse cars from the first film, but instead used a new batch of cars that were custom painted for the film in the Houston area at a body shop called Texas Custom Techniques, owned by Harold Day.

== Music ==
The film score was composed and conducted by Leonard Rosenman, who did not use any of Basil Poledouris's themes from the first film, instead composing entirely new themes and leitmotifs. The soundtrack album was released by Varèse Sarabande.

The glam metal group Babylon A.D. released a song called "The Kid Goes Wild", written by members Derek Davis, Vic Pepe and Jack Ponti. The song is played in the background in the middle part of the film, and it was also used to promote the film. The group created a music video featuring RoboCop targeting the band and having a shootout with some bad guys (footage of the film was also used).

== Release ==
=== Marketing ===
To promote the film, RoboCop made a guest appearance at WCW's pay-per-view event Capital Combat, where he rescued Sting from The Four Horsemen.

=== Home media ===
The film was released to VHS in December 1990, and released to DVD in 1998. The film received a Blu-ray release in 2011. VHS copies of RoboCop 2 began with an anti-drug PSA, starring an out-of-character Weller that announced the Boys & Girls Clubs of America, were where there was "no pot, no pills, no crack, no smack, no coke — no exceptions."

== Reception ==
=== Box office ===
RoboCop 2 debuted as the second-highest-grossing film at the box office in its opening weekend. It went on to gross $45.7 million at the U.S. box office, and additional $22,505,000 from video rentals.

=== Critical response ===
Gabriel Damon as the gun-wielding, kid drug-dealer Hob in RoboCop 2. Several critics, such as Roger Ebert, condemned the use of a killer child as "beneath contempt."

RoboCop 2 received mixed reviews from critics. While the special effects and action sequences are widely praised, a common complaint was that the film did not focus enough on RoboCop and his partner Lewis and that the film's human story of the man trapped inside the machine was ultimately lost within a sea of violence.

In his Chicago Sun Times review, Roger Ebert wrote, "Cain's sidekicks include a violent, foul-mouthed young boy named Hob, who looks to be about 12 years old but kills people without remorse, swears like Eddie Murphy, and eventually takes over the drug business... The movie's screenplay is a confusion of half-baked and unfinished ideas... the use of that killer child is beneath contempt."

The film "reset" RoboCop's character by turning him back into the monotone-voiced peacekeeper seen early in the first film, despite his reclaiming his human identity and personality by the end of that film. Many were also critical of the child villain Hob; David Nusair of Reel Film Reviews stated, "That the film asks us to swallow a moment late in the story that features Robo taking pity on an injured Hob is heavy-handed and ridiculous (we should probably be thankful the screenwriters didn't have RoboCop say something like, 'Look at what these vile drugs have done to this innocent boy')."

Janet Maslin of The New York Times wrote, "Unlike RoboCop, a clever and original science-fiction film with a genuinely tragic vision of its central character, Robocop 2 doesn't bother to do anything new. It freely borrows the situation, characters and moral questions posed by the first film." She further adds, "The difference between Robocop and its sequel, [...] is the difference between an idea and an afterthought." She also expressed her opinion about the Hob character: "The aimlessness of Robocop 2 runs so deep that after exploiting the inherent shock value of such an innocent-looking killer, the film tries to capitalize on his youth by also giving him a tearful deathbed scene." Variety wrote, "This ultraviolent, nihilistic sequel has enough technical dazzle to impress hardware fans, but obviously no one in the Orion front office told filmmakers that less is more." Peter Rainer of the Los Angeles Times panned the film.

Jay Scott, of The Globe and Mail, was one of the few prominent critics who admired the film calling it a "sleek and clever sequel. For fans of violent but clever action films, RoboCop 2 may be the sultry season's best bet: you get the gore of Total Recall and the satiric smarts of Gremlins 2: The New Batch in one high-tech package held together by modest B-movie strings. RoboCop 2 alludes to classics of horror and science-fiction (Frankenstein, Metropolis, Westworld), for sure, but it also evokes less rarefied examples of the same genres–Forbidden Planet, Godzilla, and that Z-movie about Hitler's brain in a bottle. It's ironic that the directorial coach of the first RoboCop, Paul Verhoeven, went on to Total Recall; couldn't he see that the script for Robo 2 was sleeker and swifter than Arnie's cumbersome vehicle? His absence in the driver's seat is happily unnoticed because Irvin Kershner, the engineer of sequels that often zip qualitatively past the originals (The Empire Strikes Back, The Return of a Man Called Horse, and the best Sean Connery–James Bond of all, Never Say Never Again), has tuned-up the premise until it purrs."

Review aggregation website Rotten Tomatoes retrospectively collected 140 reviews to give the film a score of 31%. The site's consensus reads, "A less satisfying rehash that generally lives down to the negative stereotype of sequels, Robocop 2 tries to deliver more of everything and ends up with less". On Metacritic the film has a score of 42 based on reviews from 22 critics, indicating "mixed or average reviews". Audiences surveyed by CinemaScore gave the film a grade B−, on scale of A to F.

The film received attention in 2013 from news media, due to its plot predicting Detroit filing for bankruptcy in the future.

== Thematic analysis ==
=== Politics and corporations ===
Kershner took the offer to direct RoboCop 2. RoboCop 2 continues the first film's critiques on American capitalism, corporate power and its resulting militarization and other perceived harmful effects; the city's greedy politics continue to benefit only a few, while other citizens have to face problems of crime, pollution, and infrastructure dilapidation due to inadequate restructuring and police strikes. Unlike the predecessor which had a self-aware tone and was hopeful the human race would last due to its rebelliousness, RoboCop 2's take on the corporate and political system is cynical, and more in the forefront of the story, with more staff of Omni-Consumer Products, including its CEO, becoming antagonists. It also includes a few humorous pokes at bleeding-heart liberalism, such as OCP recoding RoboCop into an environmentalist role model.

The creation of a second RoboCop to repeat the success of the original cyborg can be interpreted as a take on companies making their older products quickly out-of-date in order to keep selling new ones, and RoboCop 2's uncontrolled murdering of humans showcases how corporate entities devalue human life to a variable in an equation. More mock advertisements are seen, such as the MagnaVolt security system that electrocutes car thieves, and the Sunblock 5000, a blue-and-green skincare product which can cause skin cancer itself, to prevent getting skin cancer "ever since we lost the ozone layer." Noonan's idea behind Cain being a hippie was that a love for sex and drugs and hatred for law enforcement (common aspects of hippies) were harming a 1990's Detroit.

=== Humanity and masculinity ===
RoboCop 2 also elaborates on Officer Murphy's remaining humanity and the tech's effect on it. Another reason Kershner wanted to direct; he found the conflict a symbol of real-life society becoming programmed and "roboticized" by outside forces unconsciously. Kershner's intention with RoboCop 2 was to focus more on human depth and emotions and less on violence than the first film: "It's really the violence of the soul, the violence of human interaction that counts, and that's all there."

Weller summarized that the character, after "finding out" in the predecessor, is now "reaching out for ways to return to who he was." A scene depicts RoboCop spying on his former wife's home that brings back memories of his previous life; the camera presents from his point-of-view in these set of memories, which end with Murphy seeing his human face in a bathroom, changing his expression from a smile to frown, and match cutting back to the helmeted face of RoboCop in the police car. Fordham University social professor Maxwell Guttman suggests that while having memories doesn't make RoboCop more human than any other regular cyborg, the addition of unnecessary, lengthy and conflicting directives by Dr. Juliette Faxx symbolizes how complicated human behavioral science is.

David Roche and Isabelle Schmitt-Pitiot interpreted mirror sequences in RoboCop 2 and its predecessor as showing identity problems in the hypermasculine figure, and mourning the loss of a "natural" masculine identity. While the first film's sequence showcased a mixture of a fake human face and electronic parts on his head as him having a fragmented identity, the second film's memory scene showcases two separate identities, where the real human one is no longer a part of him. The re-programming of RoboCop's code and use of it for a different RoboCop also presents masculinity as changing, taking various forms, and revealing hypermasculinity to not be a good form in comparison to others.

== Influence ==
Serial killer Nathaniel White claimed to have found inspiration for his first murder while watching RoboCop 2: "The first girl I killed was from a RoboCop movie... I seen him cut somebody's throat then take the knife and slit down the chest to the stomach and left the body in a certain position. With the first person I killed I did exactly what I saw in the movie."

== Sequel ==
A sequel film, RoboCop 3, was released in 1993, with Robert Burke replacing Peter Weller as RoboCop.

== Other media ==
=== Video game ===
A video game set between RoboCop 2 and RoboCop 3, RoboCop: Rogue City, was released in 2023, with Peter Weller reprising his role.

=== Novelization ===
A mass market paperback novelization by Ed Naha, RoboCop 2: A Novel, was published by Jove Books. Marvel Comics produced a three-issue adaptation of the film by Alan Grant. Like the novelization, the comic book series includes scenes omitted from the finished movie.

=== Comic books ===
Frank Miller's original screenplay for RoboCop 2 was turned into a nine-part comic book series titled Frank Miller's RoboCop. Critical reaction to the comic adaptation of the Miller script was mixed. Ken Tucker of Entertainment Weekly gave the comic a "D" score, criticizing the "tired story" and lack of "interesting action." A recap written for the pop culture humor website I-Mockery said: "Having spent quite a lot of time with these comics over the past several days researching and writing this article, I can honestly say that it makes me want to watch the movie version of RoboCop 2 again just so I can get the bad taste out of my mouth. Or prove to myself that the movie couldn't be worse than this."

== See also ==
- List of American films of 1990
