= RoboCop =

1987 film by Paul Verhoeven

- Theatrical release poster by Mike Bryan
- Directed by: Paul Verhoeven
- Written by: Edward Neumeier; Michael Miner
- Produced by: Arne Schmidt
- Starring: Peter Weller; Nancy Allen; Daniel O'Herlihy; Ronny Cox; Kurtwood Smith; Miguel Ferrer
- Cinematography: Jost Vacano
- Edited by: Frank J. Urioste
- Music by: Basil Poledouris
- Production company: Orion Pictures
- Distributed by: Orion Pictures
- Release date: July 17, 1987
- Running time: 102 minutes
- Country: United States
- Language: English
- Budget: $13.7 million
- Box office: $53.4 million

RoboCop is a 1987 American science fiction action film directed by Paul Verhoeven and written by Edward Neumeier and Michael Miner. The film stars Peter Weller, Nancy Allen, Daniel O'Herlihy, Ronny Cox, Kurtwood Smith, and Miguel Ferrer. Set in a crime-ridden Detroit in the near future, RoboCop centers on police officer Alex Murphy (Weller) who is murdered by a gang of criminals and revived by the megacorporation Omni Consumer Products as the cyborg law enforcer RoboCop. Unaware of his former life, RoboCop executes a campaign against crime while coming to terms with the lingering fragments of his humanity.

The film was conceived by Neumeier while working on the set of Blade Runner (1982), and he developed the idea with Miner. Their script was purchased in early 1985 by producer Jon Davison on behalf of Orion Pictures. Finding a director proved difficult; Verhoeven dismissed the script twice because he did not understand its satirical content, until he was convinced of its value by his wife. Filming took place between August and October 1986, mainly in Dallas, Texas with additional filming in Las Colinas and Pittsburgh. Rob Bottin led the special-effects team in creating practical effects, violent gore and the RoboCop costume.

Verhoeven emphasized violence throughout the film, making it so outlandish that it became comical. Censorship boards believed that it was too extreme and several scenes were shortened or modified to receive an acceptable theatrical rating. RoboCop was a financial success upon its release in July 1987, earning $53.4 million. Reviewers praised it as a clever action film with deeper philosophical messages and satire, but were conflicted about its extreme violence. The film was nominated for several awards, and won an Academy Award and a number of Saturn Awards.

RoboCop has been critically reevaluated since its release, and it has been hailed as one of the best films of the 1980s and one of the greatest science fiction and action films ever made. The film has been praised for its depiction of a robot affected by the loss of humanity, in contrast to the stoic and emotionless robotic characters of that era. RoboCop has continued to be analyzed for its themes such as the nature of humanity, personal identity, corporate greed and corruption, and is seen as a rebuke of the era's Reaganomics policies. Its success created a franchise: the sequels RoboCop 2 (1990) and RoboCop 3 (1993), children's animated series, live-action television shows, video games, comic books, toys, clothing and other merchandise. A remake was released in 2014.

== Plot ==
In a near-future dystopia, Detroit is on the brink of social and financial collapse. Overwhelmed by crime and dwindling resources, the city grants the mega-corporation Omni Consumer Products (OCP) control of the Detroit Police Department. OCP senior president Dick Jones demonstrates ED-209, a law-enforcement robot designed to supplant the police. ED-209 malfunctions and brutally kills a volunteer, allowing ambitious junior executive Bob Morton to introduce OCP's chairman ("the Old Man") to his own project—RoboCop.

Meanwhile, police officer Alex Murphy is transferred to the Metro West precinct. Murphy and his new partner, Anne Lewis, pursue notorious criminal Clarence Boddicker and his gang: Emil Antonowsky, Leon Nash, Joe Cox, and Steve Minh. Lewis is incapacitated while the gang ambushes and tortures Murphy until Boddicker fatally shoots him. Morton has Murphy's corpse converted into RoboCop, a heavily armored cyborg with no memory of his former life. RoboCop is programmed with three prime directives: Serve the public trust, protect the innocent, and uphold the law. A fourth prime directive, Directive 4, is classified.

Assigned to Metro West, RoboCop is hailed by the media for his brutally efficient campaign against crime. Lewis suspects that he is Murphy, recognizing the unique way he holsters his gun (a trick Murphy learned to impress his son). After experiencing a nightmare of Murphy's death during maintenance, RoboCop encounters Lewis, who addresses him as Murphy. While on patrol, RoboCop arrests Antonowsky, who recognizes Murphy's mannerisms, furthering RoboCop's recall. RoboCop then uses the police database to identify Antonowsky's associates and review Murphy's police record. He recalls further memories while exploring Murphy's former home, his wife and son having moved away after his death. Elsewhere, Jones gets Boddicker to murder Bob Morton as revenge for Morton's attempt to usurp his position at OCP.

RoboCop tracks Boddicker's gang to a cocaine factory. After a shootout in which Minh is killed, RoboCop arrests and brutally interrogates Boddicker until he admits to working for Jones. RoboCop attempts to kill Boddicker for revenge until his programming directs him to uphold the law. RoboCop attempts to arrest Jones at the OCP Tower, but Directive 4 is activated, a fail-safe measure to neutralize RoboCop were he to act against an OCP executive. Jones admits his culpability in Morton's death and releases an ED-209 to destroy RoboCop. Although he escapes, RoboCop is attacked by the police force on OCP's order and is badly damaged. He is rescued by Lewis, who brings him to an abandoned steel mill to repair himself.

Angered by OCP's underfunding and short-staffing, the police force goes on strike, causing Detroit to descend into violent chaos. Jones frees Boddicker and his remaining gang, arming them with high-powered weaponry to destroy RoboCop. The gang are quickly eliminated at the steel mill, but Lewis is badly injured in the shootout. RoboCop confronts Jones at the OCP Tower during a board meeting, revealing the truth behind Morton's murder. Jones takes the Old Man hostage, who responds by firing him, nullifying Directive 4. RoboCop shoots Jones, causing him to crash through a window and fall several stories to his death. The Old Man compliments RoboCop's shooting and asks his name. He replies, "Murphy".

== Cast ==
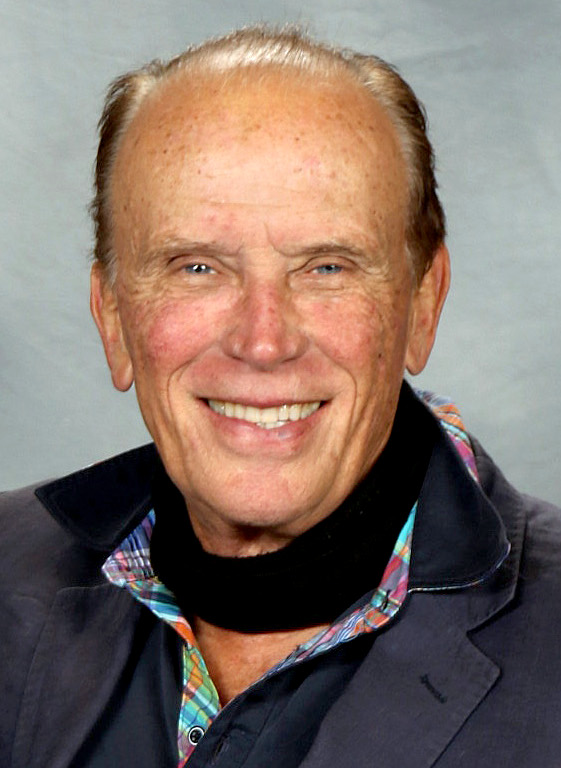
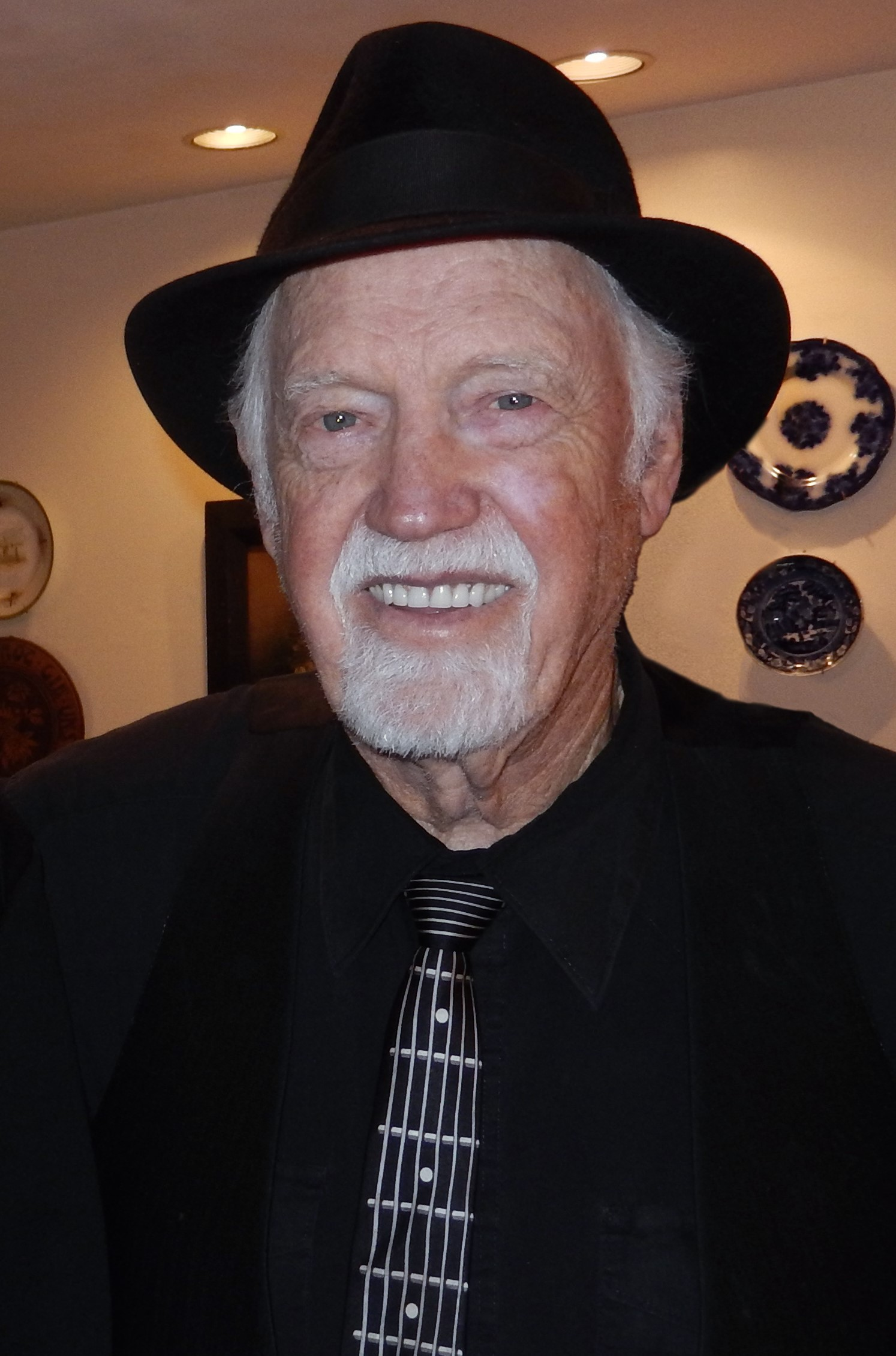
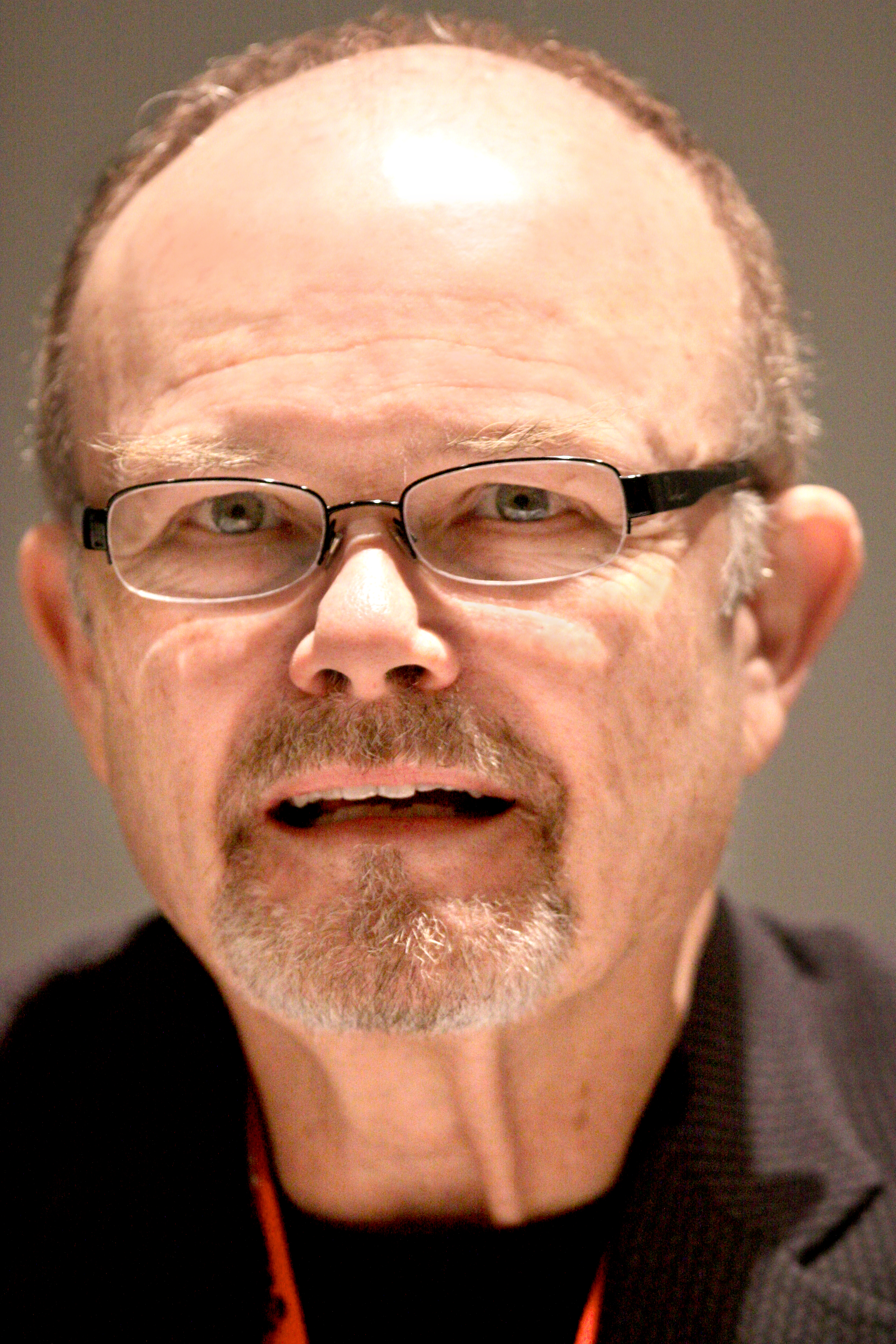
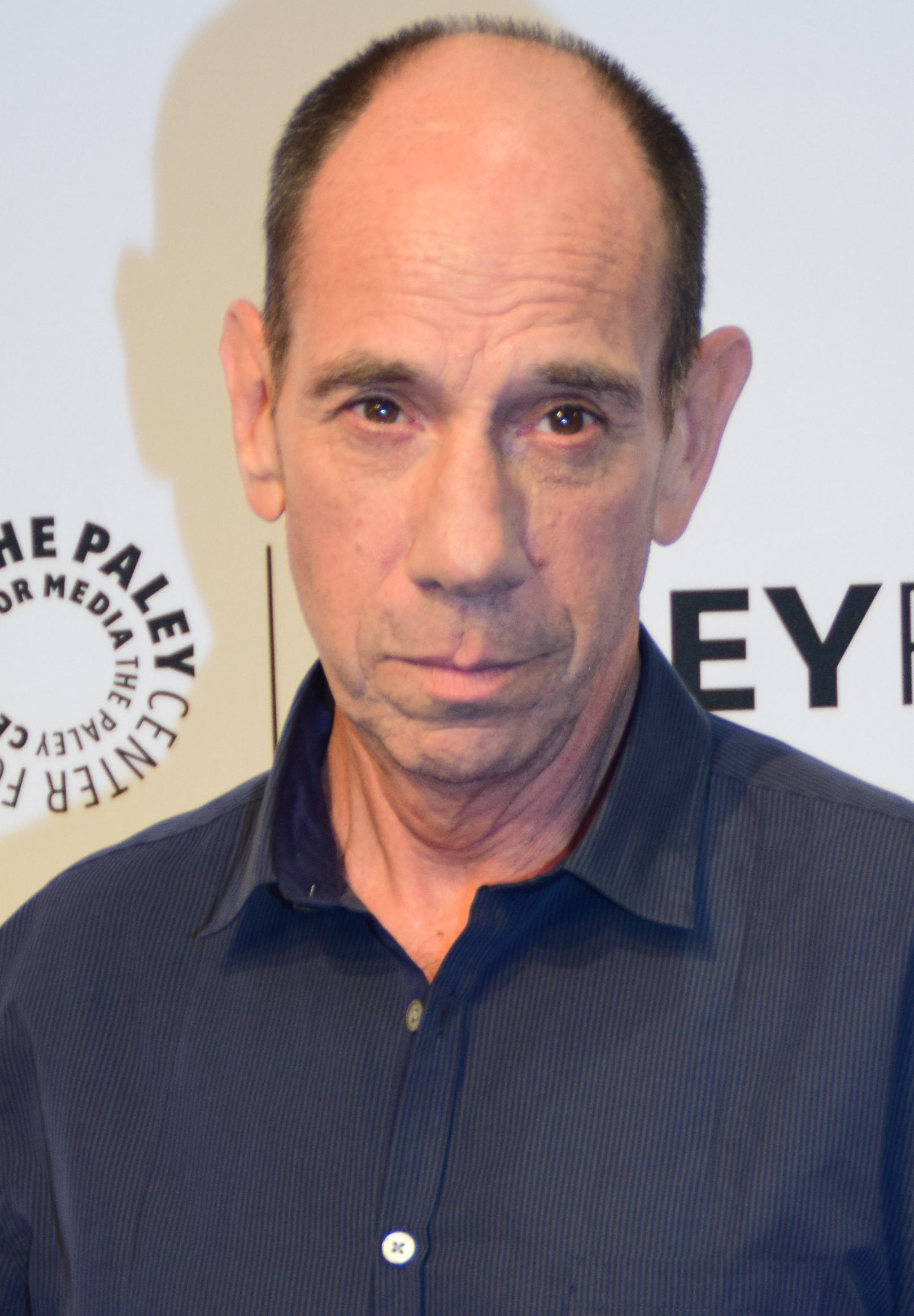
(Left to right) Peter Weller (pictured in 2016), Ronny Cox (2019), Kurtwood Smith (2010), and Miguel Ferrer (2015)
- Peter Weller as Alex Murphy / RoboCop: A Detroit police officer murdered in the line of duty and revived as a cyborg
- Nancy Allen as Anne Lewis: A tough and loyal police officer
- Daniel O'Herlihy as "The Old Man": The chief executive of OCP
- Ronny Cox as Dick Jones: The Senior President of OCP
- Kurtwood Smith as Clarence Boddicker: A crime lord in league with Dick Jones
- Miguel Ferrer as Bob Morton: An ambitious OCP junior executive responsible for the "RoboCop" project

In addition to the main cast, RoboCop features Paul McCrane as Emil Antonowsky, Ray Wise as Leon Nash, Jesse D. Goins as Joe Cox and Calvin Jung as Steve Minh, members of Boddicker's gang. The cast also includes Robert DoQui as Sergeant Warren Reed, Michael Gregory as Lieutenant Hedgecock, Felton Perry as OCP employee Donald Johnson, Kevin Page as OCP junior executive Mr. Kinney (who is shot to death by ED-209), and Lee de Broux as cocaine warehouse owner Sal.

Mario Machado and Leeza Gibbons play news hosts Casey Wong and Jess Perkins, respectively, and television-show host Bixby Snyder is played by S. D. Nemeth. Angie Bolling and Jason Levine appear as Murphy's wife and son. RoboCop director Paul Verhoeven makes a cameo appearance as a dancing nightclub patron, producer Jon Davison provides the voice of ED-209, and director John Landis appears in an in-film advertisement. Smith's partner, Joan Pirkle, appears as Dick Jones's secretary.

== Production ==
=== Conception and writing ===
RoboCop was conceived in the early 1980s by Universal Pictures junior story executive and aspiring screenwriter Edward Neumeier. (Note: Attributed to multiple references:) A fan of robot-themed science-fiction films, Star Wars, and action films, Neumeier had developed an interest in mature comic books while researching them for potential adaptation. The 1982 science-fiction film Blade Runner was filming on the Warner Bros. lot behind Neumeier's office, and he unofficially joined the production to learn about filmmaking. His work there gave him the idea for RoboCop: "I had this vision of a far-distant, Blade Runner–type world where there was an all-mechanical cop coming to a sense of real human intelligence". He spent the next few nights writing a 40-page outline.

While researching story submissions for Universal, Neumeier came across a student video by aspiring director Michael Miner. The pair met and discussed their similar concepts: Neumeier's RoboCop and Miner's robot-themed rock music video. In a 2014 interview, Miner said that he also had an idea called SuperCop. They formed a working partnership and spent about two months discussing the idea and two to three months writing together at night and over weekends, in addition to their regular jobs. (Note: Attributed to multiple references:) Their collaboration was initially difficult because they did not know each other well, and had to learn how to constructively criticize each other.

Neumeier was influenced to kill off his main character early by the psychological horror film Psycho (1960), whose main character is killed early in the film. Inspired by comic books and his experience with corporate culture, Neumeier wanted to satirize 1980s business culture. He noted the increasing aggression of American financial services in response to growing Japanese influence and the popularity on Wall Street of The Book of Five Rings, a 17th-century book about how to kill more effectively. Neumeier also believed that Detroit's declining automobile industry was due to increased bureaucracy. ED-209's malfunction in the OCP boardroom was based on Neumeier's office daydreams about a robot bursting into a meeting and killing everyone. Miner described the film as "comic relief for a cynical time" during the presidency of Ronald Reagan, when economist "Milton Friedman and the Chicago Boys ransacked the world, enabled by Reagan and the Central Intelligence Agency. So when you have this cop who works for a corporation that insists 'I own you,' and he still does the right thing—that's the core of the film." Neumeier and Miner conceived the in-universe news and advertisement "Media Breaks" that appear throughout RoboCop, and a spec script was completed by December 1984.

=== Development ===
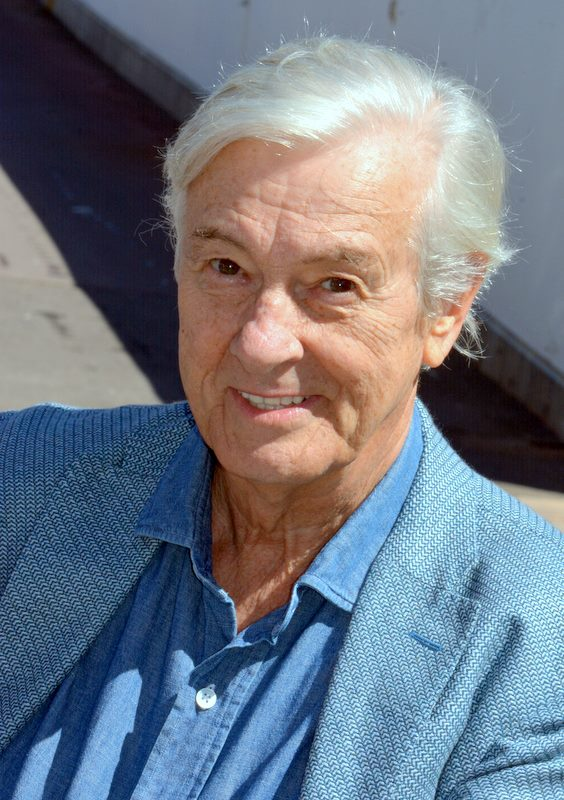
Director Paul Verhoeven (pictured in 2016) rejected the RoboCop script twice before taking to its underlying story about a character losing his identity.

The first draft of the script, RoboCop: The Future of Law Enforcement, was given to industry friends and associates in early 1985. (Note: Attributed to multiple references:) A month later, Neumeier and Miner had two offers: one from Atlantic Releasing and another from director Jonathan Kaplan and producer Jon Davison with Orion Pictures. An experienced producer of exploitation and B films such as the parody Airplane! (1980), Davison said that he was drawn to the script's satire. He showed Neumeier and Miner films—including Madigan (1968), Dirty Harry (1971), and Mad Max 2 (1981)—to demonstrate the tone he wanted. After Orion greenlit the project, Neumeier and Miner began a second draft.

Davison produced the film with his Tobor Pictures company. Neumeier and Miner were paid a few thousand dollars for the script rights and $25,000 between them for the rewrite. They were entitled to eight percent of the producer profits upon release. Davison's contacts with puppeteers, animators, and practical effects designers were essential to Verhoeven, who had no prior experience with them. The producers discussed changing the Detroit setting, but Neumeier insisted on its importance because of its failing auto industry. The connection between Clarence Boddicker and Dick Jones was added at Orion's suggestion.

Kaplan left to direct Project X (1987), and finding his replacement took six months; many prospects declined because of the film's title. (Note: Attributed to multiple references:) The project was offered to David Cronenberg, Alex Cox, and Monte Hellman; Hellman joined as second-unit director. Miner asked to direct, but Orion refused to trust a $7 million project to an untested director. He declined the second-unit director position in order to direct Deadly Weapon (1989); Orion executive Barbara Boyle suggested Paul Verhoeven—who had been praised for his work on Soldier of Orange (1977) and his first English-language film, Flesh+Blood (1985)—for director. Verhoeven looked at the first page and rejected the script as awful, stalling the project. Boyle sent Verhoeven another copy, suggesting that he pay attention to the subtext. Verhoeven was still uninterested until his wife Martine read it and encouraged him to give it a chance, saying he had missed the "soul" of the story about someone losing his identity. Not fluent in English, Verhoeven said that the satire did not make sense to him; the scene that attracted his attention was RoboCop returning to Murphy's abandoned home and experiencing memories of his former life.

Davison, Neumeier and Verhoeven discussed the project at Culver Studios' Mansion House. Verhoeven wanted to direct it as a serious film; Neumeier gave him comic books to explain the tone they wanted, including 2000 AD with the character Judge Dredd. Neumeier and Miner wrote a third draft based on Verhoeven's requests, working through injuries and late nights; the 92-page revision included a subplot about a romantic affair between Murphy and Lewis. After reading it, Verhoeven admitted that he was wrong and returned to the second draft in search of a comic-book tone.

=== Casting ===
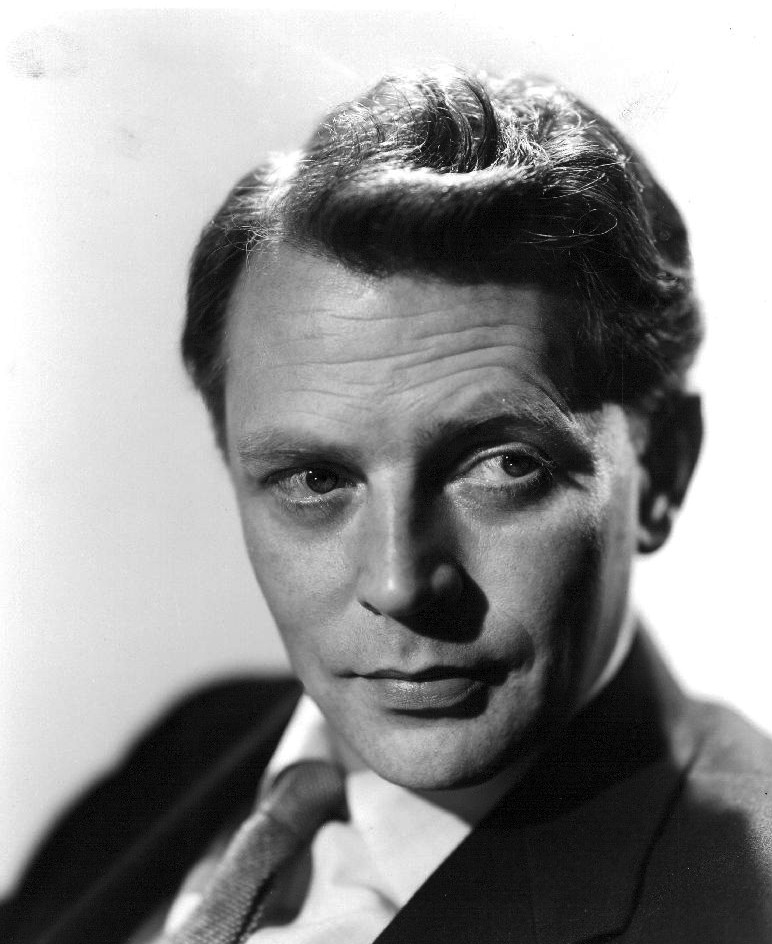
Daniel O'Herlihy in 1955. His character, the Old Man, was based on MCA Inc. executive Lew Wasserman.

Six to eight months were spent searching for an actor to play Alex Murphy / RoboCop. Arnold Schwarzenegger, Michael Ironside, Rutger Hauer, Tom Berenger, Armand Assante, Keith Carradine and James Remar were considered. Orion favored Schwarzenegger, the star of their recent success The Terminator (1984), but he and other actors were considered too physically imposing to be believable in the RoboCop costume; it was thought that Schwarzenegger would look like the Michelin Man or the Pillsbury Doughboy. Others were reluctant because their face would be largely concealed by a helmet. Davison said that Weller was the only person who wanted to be in the film. The low salary he commanded was in his favor, as were his good body control from martial-arts training and marathon running and his fan base in the science-fiction genre after his performance in The Adventures of Buckaroo Banzai Across the 8th Dimension (1984). Verhoeven said he hired him because "his chin was very good". Weller spent months working with mime Moni Yakim, developing a fluid movement style with a stiff ending while wearing an American football uniform to approximate the finished costume. Weller said that working with Verhoeven was his main reason for choosing the role over appearing in King Kong Lives (1986).

Stephanie Zimbalist was cast as Murphy's partner Anne Lewis, but dropped out because of contractual obligations to Remington Steele (which had been canceled in 1986, but was revived because of its popularity). (Note: Attributed to multiple references:) Her replacement, Nancy Allen, thought the film's title was terrible but found the script engrossing. Allen was known for her long blonde hair, but Verhoeven wanted it cut short so the character was not sexualized. Her hair was cut eight times before the desired look was achieved. Allen undertook police-academy training for her role, and sought advice from her police lieutenant father. Verhoeven encouraged her to act masculine and gain weight, which she accomplished by quitting smoking.

Kurtwood Smith auditioned for Boddicker and Jones. He was known mainly for television work, but had not had film success, and saw RoboCop as a B-film with potential. The character was scripted to wear glasses so he would look like Nazi Party member Heinrich Himmler. Smith was unaware of this, and interpreted it as the character having an intelligent and militaristic front to conceal being a "sneering, smirking drug kingpin". Ironside was offered the role, but did not want to be involved with another special effects-laden film or play a "psychopath" after working on Extreme Prejudice (1987). Robert Picardo also auditioned for the role.

Ronny Cox had been stereotyped as playing generally nice characters, and said that this left the impression that he could not play more mean roles. Because of this, Verhoeven cast him as the villainous Dick Jones. Cox said that playing a villain was "about a gazillion times more fun than playing the good guys". Jones, he said, has no compassion and is an "evil [son of a bitch]". Miguel Ferrer was unsure if the film would be successful, but was desperate for work and would have accepted any offer. The Old Man was based on MCA Inc. CEO Lew Wasserman, whom Neumeier considered a powerful and intimidating individual. Television host Bixby Snyder was written as an Americanized, more-extreme version of British comedian Benny Hill. Radio personality Howard Stern was offered an unspecified role, but turned it down because he thought the idea was stupid (although he later praised the finished film).

=== Filming ===
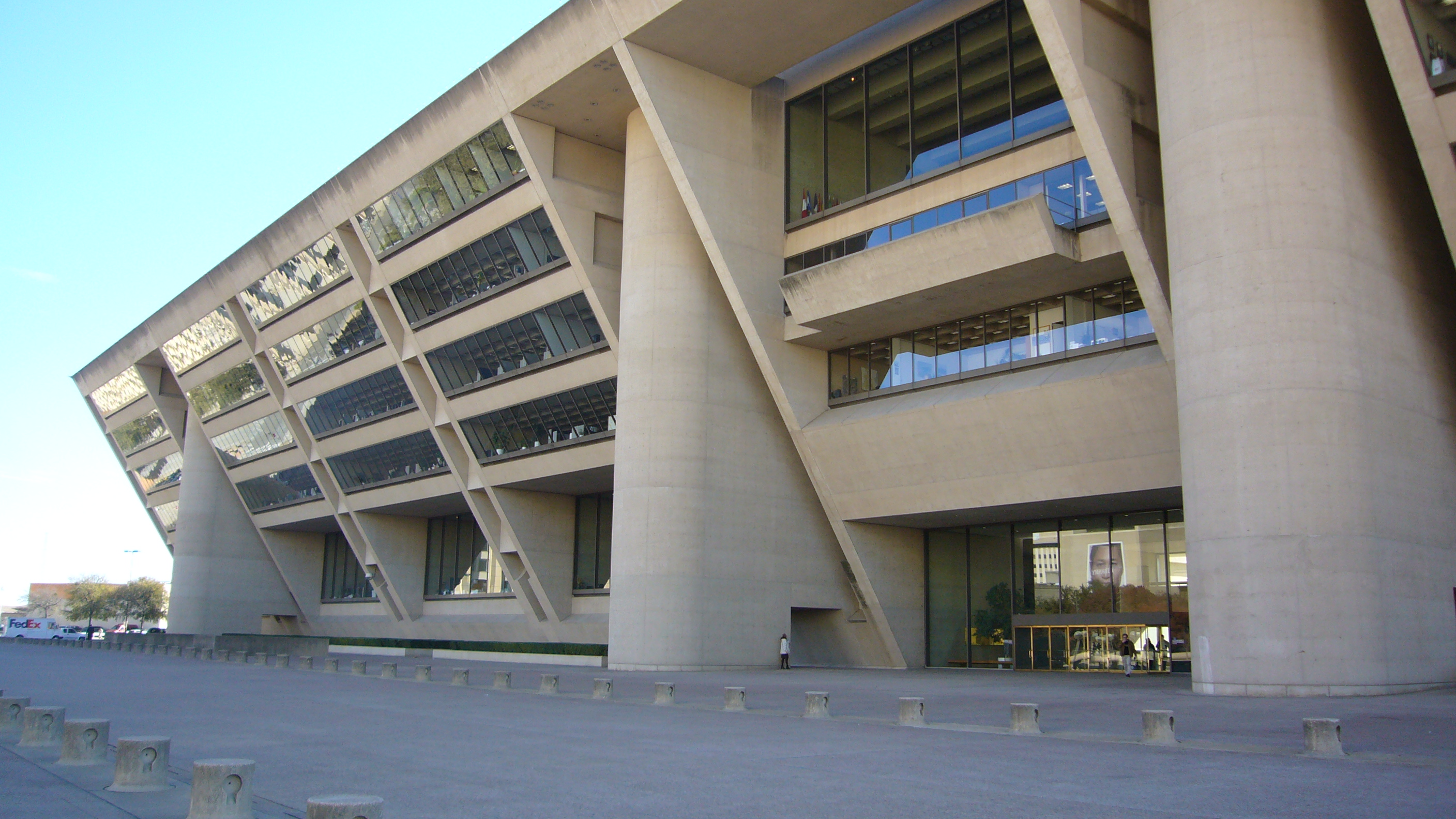
Dallas City Hall appears as the exterior of OCP's headquarters. Matte paintings were used to make it appear taller.

Principal photography began on August 6, 1986, on an $11 million budget. Jost Vacano was the cinematographer, after working with Verhoeven on Soldier of Orange. Verhoeven wanted Blade Runner production designer Lawrence G. Paull, but Davison said he could afford "either a great production designer or a great RoboCop costume – not both." William Sandell was hired instead. Monte Hellman directed several of the action scenes.

RoboCop was filmed primarily on location in Dallas, with additional filming in Las Colinas and Pittsburgh. Verhoeven wanted a filming location which suggested the near future. Detroit was dismissed because it had many low buildings, many brownstones and Victorian-style buildings. Neumeier said that it was also a union city, making it more expensive to film there. Detroit made a brief appearance in nighttime, stock aerial footage at the beginning of the film. Chicago was dismissed for aesthetic reasons, New York City for high costs, and California because according to Davison, Orion wanted to distance itself from the project. Dallas was chosen over Houston because it has modern buildings and older, less-maintained areas where explosives could be used. The filming schedule in Dallas was nine weeks, but it soon became clear that it would take longer. Based on filmed footage, Orion approved the schedule extension and a budget increase to $13.1 million. The weather fluctuated during filming; Dallas in summer was often 90 to 115 °F (32 to 46 °C), and the weather in Pittsburgh was frigid.

RoboCop's costume was not finished until some time into filming. This did not impact the shooting schedule, but it denied Weller the month of costume rehearsal he had expected. (Note: Attributed to multiple references:) Weller was frustrated with the costume; it was too cumbersome for him to move as he had practiced, and he spent hours trying to adapt. He struggled to see through the thin helmet visor and interact with (or grab) objects while wearing the gloves. Weller fell out with Verhoeven and was fired, with Lance Henriksen considered as a replacement; because the costume was designed for Weller, however, he was encouraged to mend fences. Mime Moni Yakim helped Weller to develop a slower, more deliberate way of moving. Weller's experience in the costume was worsened by the warm weather, which made him sweat off up to 3 lb (1.4 kg) per day. Verhoeven began taking prescription medication to cope with stress-induced insomnia, and he filmed scenes under the influence.

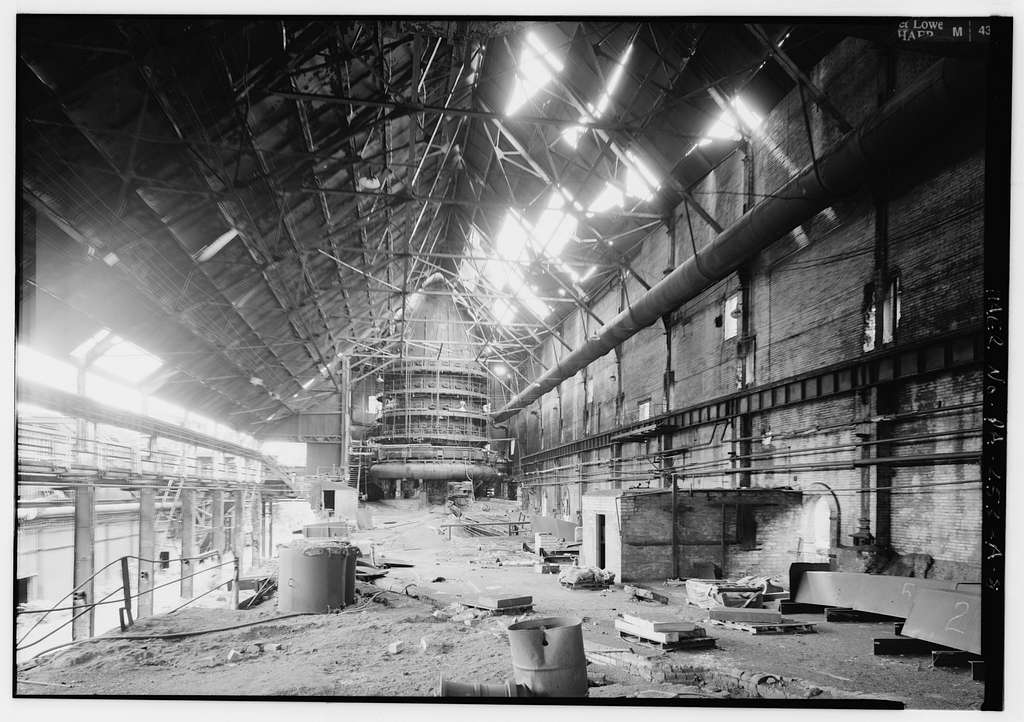
A steel mill in Pennsylvania served as the site of RoboCop's and Clarence Boddicker's final battle.

He often choreographed scenes with the actors before filming. Improvisation was also encouraged, because Verhoeven believed that it could produce interesting results. Smith improvised some of his character's quirks, such as sticking chewing gum to a secretary's desk and spitting blood onto the police-station counter: "'What if I spat blood on the desk?' ... [Verhoeven] got this little smile on his face, and we did it." Neumeier was on set throughout filming and occasionally wrote additional scenes, including a New Year's Eve party after seeing some party-hat props and a news story about the Strategic Defense Initiative platform misfiring. Verhoeven found Neumeier's presence invaluable, because they could discuss how to adapt the script or location to make a scene work.

Verhoeven gained a reputation for verbal aggression and unsociable behavior on set; Smith said that he never yelled at the actors, however, but was too engrossed in filming to be sociable. Cox and Allen spoke warmly of Verhoeven. Weller spent his time between filming with the actors who played his enemies (including Smith, Ray Wise and Calvin Jung), who maintained healthy lifestyles that supported Weller in his training for the New York City Marathon.

A number of locations in and around Dallas were used in production. An office in Renaissance Tower was used for the OCP interior; the company's exterior is Dallas City Hall, modified with matte paintings to appear taller. (Note: Attributed to multiple references:) The OCP elevator was that of the Plaza of the Americas. The Detroit police station's exterior is Crozier Tech High School; its interior is the Sons of Hermann hall, and city hall is the Dallas Municipal Building. Scenes of Boddicker's gang blowing up storefronts were filmed in the Deep Ellum neighborhood. One explosion was larger than anticipated; actors can be seen moving out of the way, Smith had to remove his coat because it was on fire, and the actors involved received an additional $400 in stunt pay. The Shell gas station that explodes was in the Arts District, where local residents unaware of the filming called the fire department. The scene was scripted for flames to modify the sign to read "hell"; Davison approved it, but it does not appear in the film. Miner called it a disappointing omission.

The nightclub was the former Starck Club. Verhoeven was filmed demonstrating how the clubbers should dance, and used the footage in the film. Other Dallas locations included César Chávez Boulevard, the Reunion Arena and the parking lot of the Crescent. The final battle between RoboCop and Boddicker's gang was filmed at a steel mill in Monessen, outside Pittsburgh. (Note: Attributed to multiple references:) Filming ended in late October 1986.

Weller said that the filming experience was among the worst of his life, mainly because of the RoboCop costume. Verhoeven also considered filming RoboCop a miserable experience, in part due to the difficulties with special effects and other things going wrong. Ferrer, however, described it as the best summer of his life.

=== Post-production ===
"Rock Shop" by Basil Poledouris
The main theme of RoboCop by Basil Poledouris. Performed by the Sinfonia of London, the score combines orchestral music with synthesizers.

An additional $600,000 budget increase was approved by Orion for post-production and the music score, raising the budget to $13.7 million. (Note: Attributed to multiple references:) (Note: The 1987 budget of $13.7 million is equivalent to $38.8 million in 2025.)

Frank J. Urioste was the film's editor. Several pick-up shots were filmed during this phase, including Murphy's death, RoboCop removing his helmet, and shots of his leg holster. After the OCP boardroom scene in which RoboCop calls himself Murphy, another scene revealed that Lewis was alive in a hospital before showing RoboCop on patrol. The latter scene was thought to lessen the former's triumphant feeling, and was removed. Verhoeven wanted the in-film Media Breaks to abruptly interrupt the narrative and unsettle the viewer. He was influenced by Piet Mondrian's art, which featured stark black lines separating colored squares. Peter Conn directed many of the Media Breaks, but "TJ Lazer" was directed by Neumeier.

RoboCop's violent content made it difficult to receive an R rating from the Motion Picture Association of America (MPAA), which restricted the film to viewers over 17 unless accompanied by an adult. It initially received the more-restrictive X rating, limiting the film to those over 17. Although some reports suggest it was refused an R-rating eleven times, Verhoeven said that the number was actually eight. The MPAA took issue with several scenes, including Murphy's death and ED-209 shooting an executive. The violent scenes were shortened and Media Breaks were added to help lighten the mood; Verhoeven recalled that one reviewer was confused by their jarring appearance in the film, and complained that the projectionist had used the wrong film reel.

The MPAA also objected to a scene of a mutated Emil being disintegrated by Boddicker's car, but Verhoeven, Davison and Orion refused to remove it because it consistently received the biggest laughs during test screenings. Verhoeven made the violence comical and surreal, and believed that the cuts made the scenes appear more (not less) violent. He said that his young children laughed at the X-rated cut, and audiences laughed less at the R-rated version. According to Verhoeven, people "love seeing violence and horrible things". The film is 103 minutes long.

Basil Poledouris composed the film score after working with Verhoeven on Flesh + Blood. The score combines synthesizers and orchestral music, reflecting RoboCop's cyborg nature. The music was performed by the Sinfonia of London.

== Special effects and design ==
=== Special effects ===
Actor Paul McCrane as Emil Antonowsky. McCrane wore a prosthesis over his upper body to give the appearance of his skin melting. His death was the highest-rated scene by test audiences.

The special-effects team, led by Rob Bottin, included Phil Tippett, Stephan Dupuis, Bart Mixon and Craig Davies. (Note: Attributed to multiple references:) The effects were very violent because Verhoeven believed that this made scenes funnier. He compared the brutality of Murphy's death to the crucifixion of Jesus, an effective way to evoke sympathy for the character. The scene was filmed at an abandoned auto-assembly plant in Long Beach, California, on a raised stage that allowed operators to control the effects from below. To show Murphy being dismantled by gunfire, prosthetic arms were cast in alginate and filled with tubing that could pump artificial blood and compressed air. Weller's left hand, attached to his shoulders by velcro and controlled by three operators, was designed to explode in a controllable way so it could be easily put back together for repeat shots. The right arm was jerked away from Weller's body by a monofilament wire. A detailed, articulated replica of Weller's upper body was used to depict Boddicker shooting Murphy through the head. A mold was made of Weller's face using foam latex that was baked to make it rubbery and flesh-like, and placed over a fiberglass skull containing a blood squib and explosive charge. The articulated head was controlled by four puppeteers, and had details of sweat and blood. A fan motor attached to the body made it vibrate, as if shaking in fear. The charge in the skull was connected to the trigger of Smith's gun by wire to synchronize the effect.

Emil's melting condition was inspired by the 1977 science-fiction film The Incredible Melting Man. Bottin designed and constructed Emil's prosthetics, creating a foam-latex headpiece and matching gloves that gave the appearance of Emil's skin melting "off his bones like marshmallow sauce". A second piece, depicting further degradation, was applied over the first. Dupuis painted each piece differently to emphasize Emil's advancing degradation. The prosthetics were applied to an articulated dummy to show Emil being struck by Boddicker's car. The head was loosened so it would fly off; by chance, it rolled onto the car's hood. The effect was completed with Emil's liquified body (raw chicken, soup, and gravy) washing over the windscreen. The same dummy stands in for RoboCop when he is crushed by steel beams (painted wood). Verhoeven wanted RoboCop to kill Boddicker by stabbing him in the eye, but it was believed the effort to create the effect would be wasted due to censorship concerns.

Dick Jones's fatal fall is shown by a stop-motion puppet of Cox, animated by Rocco Gioffre. The limited development time forced Gioffre to use a foam-rubber puppet with an aluminum skeleton instead of a better-quality, articulated version. It was composited against Mark Sullivan's matte painting of the street below. ED-209's murder of OCP executive Mr. Kinney was filmed over three days. Kevin Page's body was covered with 200 squibs, but Verhoeven was unhappy with the result and brought him back months later to re-shoot it in a studio-built recreation of the board room. Page was again covered in over 200 squibs and plastic bags filled with spaghetti squash and fake blood. Page described intense pain as each squib detonation felt like a punch. In the cocaine-warehouse scene, Boddicker's stuntman was thrown through glass panes rigged with detonating cord to shatter microseconds before he hit. Gelatin capsules filled with sawdust and a sparkling compound were fired from an air gun at RoboCop to create the effect of ricocheting bullets.

=== RoboCop ===
Bottin was tasked with designing the RoboCop costume. He researched the Star Wars character C-3PO and its stiff costume, which made movement difficult. Bottin was also influenced by robot designs in Metropolis (1927), The Day the Earth Stood Still (1951), and several comic-book superheroes. He developed about 50 designs based on feedback from Verhoeven (who pushed for a more machine-like character), before settling on a sleek aesthetic inspired by the work of Japanese illustrator Hajime Sorayama. Verhoeven admitted his unrealistic expectations after reading Japanese science-fiction manga; it took him a while to realize it, which contributed to the costume delay.

The scope of the RoboCop costume was unprecedented, with its design and construction exceeding cost and schedule. The costume took six months to build with flexible foam latex, semi-and completely-rigid polyurethane, and a fiberglass helmet. Moving sections were joined with aluminum and ball bearings. The costume is supported by an internal harness of hooks, allowing for sustained movement during action scenes. Seven costumes were made, including a fireproof version and costumes depicting sustained damage. Reports on their weight vary from 25 to 80 lb (11 to 36 kg). (Note: Attributed to multiple references:) RoboCop's gun, the Auto-9, is a Beretta 93R with an extended barrel and larger grip. It was modified to fire blank bullets, and vents were cut into the side to allow for multi-directional muzzle flashes with every three-shot burst.

=== ED-209 ===
To budget for ED-209's development, Tippett developed preliminary sketches and hired Davies to design the full-scale model which was constructed with the help of Paula Lucchesi. Verhoeven wanted ED-209 to look mean, and thought that Davies' early designs lacked a "killer" aesthetic. Davies was influenced by killer whales and a United States Air Force LTV A-7 Corsair II. He approached the design with modern American aesthetics and a corporate-design policy that he believed prioritized looks over functionality, including excessive and impractical components. He did not add eyes, thinking that they would make ED-209 more sympathetic. The fully-articulated fiberglass model took four months to build, cost $25,000, stood 7 feet (2.1 m) tall, and weighed 300 to 500 lb (140 to 230 kg). The 100-hour work weeks took their toll and Davies minimized the detail of ED-209's feet, since he did not think they would be shown. The model was later used on promotional tours.

Davies spent another four months building two 12-inch (30 cm) miniature replicas for stop motion animation. The two small models allowed scenes to be animated and filmed more efficiently, which saved time in completing the 55 shots needed in three months. Tippett was the lead ED-209 animator, assisted by Randal M. Dutra and Harry Walton. Tippett conceived ED-209's movement as "unanimal"-like, as if it were about to fall over before catching itself. To complete the character, the droid was given the roar of a leopard. Davison provided a temporary voiceover for ED-209's speaking voice, which was retained in the film.

=== Other effects and designs ===
RoboCop contains seven matte effects, mainly painted by Gioffre. Each matte was painted on masonite. Gioffre supervised on-site filming to mask the camera where the matte is inserted, and remembered having to crawl out from a five-story-high ledge to get the right shot of the Plaza of the Americas. The burnished steel RoboCop logo was developed using photographic effects that supervisor Peter Kuran based on a black-and-white sketch from Orion. Kuran created a scaled-up matte version and backlit it. A second pass was made with a sheet of aluminum behind it to create reflective detail. RoboCop's vision was created with hundreds of ink lines on acetate composited over existing footage. Several attempts had to be made to get the line thickness right; at first, the lines were too thick or too thin. Assuming that thermographic photography would be expensive, Kuran replicated thermal vision using actors in body stockings painted with thermal colors and filmed the scene with a polarized lens filter. RoboCop's mechanical recharging chair was designed by John Zabrucky. The OCP boardroom model of Delta City was made under the supervision of art director Gayle Simon.

The film's police cars are 1986 Ford Taurus models painted black. The Taurus was chosen because of its futuristic, aerodynamic styling for the vehicle's first production year. The car was intended to feature a customized interior that would show graphical displays of mug shots, fingerprints, and other related information, but the concept was considered too ambitious. The 6000 SUX driven by Boddicker and others was an Oldsmobile Cutlass Supreme, modified by Gene Winfield and based on a design by Chip Foose. Two working cars were made with a third, non-functional one that was used when the vehicle exploded. The 6000 SUX commercial features a plasticine dinosaur animated by Don Waller and blocked by Steve Chiodo.

== Release ==
=== Context ===
Industry experts were optimistic about the theatrical summer of 1987 (June–September). The season focused on genre films—science fiction, horror, and fantasy—that were proven to generate revenue, if not industry respect. Other films—such as Roxanne, Full Metal Jacket and The Untouchables—were targeted at older audiences (over age 25), who had been ignored in recent years by films targeted at teenagers. The action comedy Beverly Hills Cop II was predicted to dominate the theaters but many other films were expected to perform well, including the action adventure Ishtar, the comedies Harry and the Hendersons, Who's That Girl and Spaceballs, the action film Predator and sequels such as Superman IV: The Quest for Peace and The Living Daylights, the latest James Bond film. With the musical La Bamba, RoboCop was predicted to be a sleeper hit. It received positive feedback before release, including a positive industry screening (considered a rarity) and pre-release screenings that demonstrated the studio's confidence in the film.

=== Marketing ===
The RoboCop logo used in the film

Marketing the film was considered difficult. For the Los Angeles Times, Jack Mathews described RoboCop as a "terrible title for a movie that anyone would expect an adult to enjoy". Orion head of marketing Charles Glenn said it had a "certain liability ... it sounds like 'Robby the Robot' or Gobots or something else. It's nothing like that." The campaign began three months before the film's release, when 5,000 adult-oriented and family-friendly trailers were sent to theaters. Orion promotions director Jan Kean said that children and adults responded positively to the RoboCop character. Miguel Ferrer recalled a theater audience laughing derisively at the trailer, which he found disheartening. Models and actors in fiberglass RoboCop costumes made appearances in cities throughout North America. The character appeared at a motor-racing event in Florida, a laser show in Boston, a subway in New York City, and children could take their picture with him at the Sherman Oaks Galleria in Los Angeles.

An incomplete version of the unrated film was screened early for critics, which was unconventional for an action film. Glenn reasoned that critics who favored Verhoeven's earlier work would appreciate RoboCop. Feedback was generally positive, providing quotes for promotional material and making it one of the best-reviewed films of the year up to that point. The week before release saw the introduction of television commercials and limited theatrical screenings for the public. The film was released in the United Kingdom without cuts, which the BBFC justified by the comic excess of the violence and the clear line between the hero and villains.

=== Box office ===
RoboCop began a wide North American release on July 17, 1987. During its opening weekend, the film earned $8 million from 1,580 theaters—an average of $5,068 per theater. It was the weekend's number-one film, ahead of a re-release of the 1937 animated film Snow White and the Seven Dwarfs ($7.5 million) and the horror sequel Jaws: The Revenge ($7.2 million), both of which were also in their first week of release. RoboCop retained the number-one position in its second weekend with an additional gross of $6.3 million, ahead of Snow White ($6.05 million) and the debuting comedy Summer School ($6 million). It was the fourth-highest-grossing film in its third weekend with a gross of $4.7 million, behind La Bamba ($5.2 million) and the debuts of the horror film The Lost Boys ($5.2 million) and The Living Daylights ($11.1 million).

RoboCop never regained the number-one spot, but remained in the top ten for six weeks. By the end of its theatrical run, the film had grossed about $53.4 million and was a modest success. (Note: The 1987 box office gross of $53.4 million is equivalent to $151 million in 2025.) It was the year's fourteenth-highest-grossing film, behind Crocodile Dundee ($53.6 million), La Bamba ($54.2 million) and Dragnet ($57.4 million). Figures are unavailable for the film's performance outside North America.

Due in part to higher ticket prices and an extra week of the theatrical summer, 1987 set a record of $1.6 billion in box-office gross and exceeded the previous record of $1.58 billion record set in 1984. Unlike that summer, which featured several blockbusters such as Ghostbusters and Indiana Jones and the Temple of Doom, the summer of 1987 delivered only one: Beverly Hills Cop II. More films (including RoboCop) performed modestly well, however, earning a collective total of $274 million—a 50-percent increase over 1986. The average audience age continued to increase, as teen-oriented films such as RoboCop and Beverly Hills Cop II had a 22-percent drop in performance from similar 1986 films. Adult-oriented films had a 39-percent increase in revenue. RoboCop was one of the summer's surprise successes, and contributed to Orion's improving fortunes.

== Reception ==
=== Critical response ===
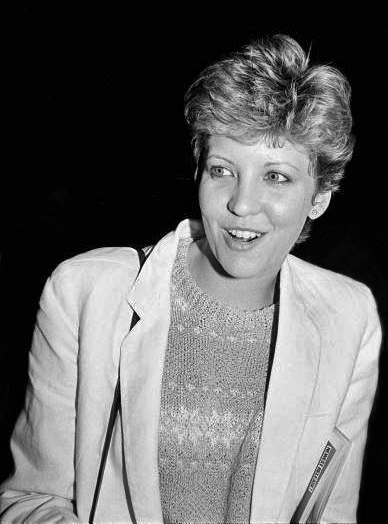
Variety's review highlighted Nancy Allen (pictured in 1984) for providing the only human warmth in RoboCop.

RoboCop opened to generally positive reviews. Audience polls by CinemaScore reported that moviegoers gave the film an average letter grade of A−.

Critics noticed influences in the film from the action of The Terminator (1984) and Aliens (1986), and the narratives of Frankenstein (1931), Repo Man (1984) and the television series Miami Vice. RoboCop built a distinct, futuristic vision for Detroit, wrote two reviewers, as Blade Runner had done for Los Angeles. A number of critics struggled to identify the film's genre, writing that it combined social satire and philosophy with elements of action, science fiction, thrillers, Westerns, slapstick comedy, romance, snuff films, superhero comics and camp without being derivative. (Note: Attributed to multiple references:)

Some publications found Verhoeven's direction smart and darkly comic, offering sharp social satire that The Washington Post suggested would have been just a simple action film in another director's hands. Others, such as Dave Kehr of the Chicago Reader, believed the film was over-directed with Verhoeven's European filmmaking style lacking rhythm, tension and momentum. According to the Chicago Reader review, Verhoeven's typical adeptness at portraying the "sleazily psychological" through physicality failed to properly use RoboCop's "Aryan blandness". The Washington Post and Roger Ebert praised Weller's performance and his ability to elicit sympathy and convey chivalry and vulnerability while concealed beneath a bulky costume. Weller offered a certain beauty and grace, wrote The Washington Post reviewer, that added a mythic quality and made his murder even more horrible. In contrast, Weller "hardly registered" behind the mask for the Chicago Reader. Variety cited Nancy Allen as providing the only human warmth in the film, and Kurtwood Smith as a well-cast "sicko sadist".

Many reviewers noted the film's violence. (Note: Attributed to multiple references:) It was so excessive for Ebert and the Los Angeles Times that it became deliberately comical, with Ebert writing that ED-209 killing an executive subverted audience expectations of a seemingly serious and straightforward science-fiction film. The Los Angeles Times reviewer believed that the violent scenes simultaneously conveyed sadism and poignancy. Other reviewers were more critical, including Kehr and Walter Goodman, who believed that RoboCop's satire and critiques of corporate corruption were excuses to indulge in violent visuals. The Chicago Reader found the violence had a "brooding, agonized quality ... as if Verhoeven were both appalled and fascinated" by it, and The Christian Science Monitor said critical praise for the "nasty" film demonstrated a preference for "style over substance".

Kehr and The Washington Post said that the satire of corporations and the interchangeable use of corporate executives and street-level criminals was the film's most successful effort, depicting their unchecked greed and callous disregard with witty criticism of game shows and military culture. Some reviewers appreciated the film's adaptation of a classic narrative about a tragic hero seeking revenge and redemption, with the Los Angeles Times writing that the typical cliché revenge story was transformed by making the protagonist a machine that keeps succumbing to humanity, emotion and idealism. The Los Angeles Times and The Philadelphia Inquirer considered RoboCop's victory satisfying because it offered a fable about a decent hero fighting against corruption, villains and the theft of his humanity, with morality and technology on his side. The Washington Post agreed that the film's "heart" is the story of Murphy regaining his humanity: "[W]ith all our flesh-and-blood heroes failing us—from brokers to ballplayers—we need a man of mettle, a real straight shooter who doesn't fool around with Phi Beta Kappas and never puts anything up his nose. What this world needs is 'RoboCop'."

=== Accolades ===
RoboCop received a Special Achievement for Best Sound Editing (Stephen Flick and John Pospisil) at the 60th Academy Awards. The film had two other nominations: Best Film Editing for Frank J. Urioste (losing to Gabriella Cristiani for the drama film The Last Emperor) and Best Sound for Michael J. Kohut, Carlos Delarios, Aaron Rochin and Robert Wald (losing to Bill Rowe and Ivan Sharrock for The Last Emperor). In a comedy routine at the event, the RoboCop character rescued presenter Pee-wee Herman from ED-209.

At the 42nd British Academy Film Awards, RoboCop received two nominations: Best Makeup and Hair for Carla Palmer (losing to Fabrizio Sforza for The Last Emperor), and Best Special Visual Effects for Bottin, Tippett, Kuran, and Gioffre (losing to George Gibbs, Richard Williams, Ken Ralston, and Edward Jones for the 1988 fantasy film Who Framed Roger Rabbit).

At the 15th Saturn Awards, RoboCop was the most-nominated film. It received awards for Best Science Fiction Film, Best Director for Verhoeven, Best Writing for Neumeier and Miner, Best Make-up for Bottin and Dupuis, and Best Special Effects for Kuran, Tippett, Bottin, and Gioffre. The film received three more nominations, including Best Actor (Weller) and Best Actress (Allen).

== After release ==
=== Home media ===
Richard Nixon shaking hands with a costumed actor as part of a paid effort to promote the film

RoboCop was released on VHS on January 28, 1988, priced at $89.98; and had an estimated $24 million in sales. (Note: The 1988 VHS cost of $89.98 is equivalent to $245.00 in 2025. The VHS sales generated an estimated $24 million, equivalent to $65.3 million in 2025.) Orion promoted the film by having former United States president Richard Nixon shake hands with a RoboCop-costumed actor. Nixon was paid $25,000, which he donated to the Boys Club of America. RoboCop was a popular rental, peaking at number one in mid-March 1988. Rental demand outstripped supply; estimates suggested that there was one VHS copy of a film per 100 households, making it difficult to find new releases such as Dirty Dancing, Predator and Platoon. The longest waiting list was for RoboCop. The film was released in S-VHS in 1988, one of the earliest films to adopt the format, and was offered free of charge when buying branded S-VCR players.

The extended violent content removed from the U.S. theatrical release was restored on a Criterion Collection LaserDisc, which included audio commentary by Verhoeven, Neumeier and Davison. The uncut version of the film has been made available on other home-media releases. It was released on DVD by Criterion in September 1998. In June 2004, the DVD version was released in a trilogy box set with RoboCop 2 (1990) and RoboCop 3 (1993). This edition included featurettes about the making of the film and the RoboCop design. A 20th-anniversary edition was released in August 2007 which included the film's theatrical and uncut versions, previous extras, and new featurettes on the special effects and villains.

Its scheduled Blu-ray debut in 2006 by Sony Pictures Home Entertainment was canceled days before release, with reviews indicating poor video quality. A new version was released in 2007 by Fox Home Entertainment without extra features. Reviews indicated that the film's visual quality had improved, but images were still perceived as grainy or too dark. The trilogy was released as a Blu-ray Disc box set in October 2010.

The film was restored in 4K resolution from the original camera negative in 2013. A two-disc limited-edition Blu-ray set was released in 2019 by Arrow Video which included collectible items (a poster and cards), new commentaries by film historians and fans, deleted scenes, new featurettes with Allen and casting director Julie Selzer, and the theatrical, extended and television cuts of the film. Arrow re-released the set on Ultra HD Blu-ray in 2022, which included the uncut scenes re-scanned from the negative to match the quality of the theatrical-cut scans.

=== Other media ===
RoboCop was considered easier to merchandise than other R-rated films and, despite its violent content, its merchandise was targeted at a younger audience. Merchandise included cap guns and other toys, comic books, (Note: Attributed to multiple references:) theme-park rides, novels and RoboCop Ultra Police action figures, which were released with the 1988 animated series RoboCop. By the time of the film's release, Marvel Comics had published a black-and-white comic-book adaptation of the film without violence and adult language; a video game was in development, and negotiations were underway to release T-shirts, other video games and RoboCop dolls by Christmas. The film's poster, painted by Mike Bryan, was reportedly more popular than the Sports Illustrated Swimsuit Issue and its novelization, written by Ed Naha, was in its second printing by July. Since its release, RoboCop has continued to be merchandised with collectible action figures, clothing and crockery. (Note: Attributed to multiple references:) A 2014 book, RoboCop: The Definitive History, details the RoboCop franchise.

The story of RoboCop has been continued in comics, initially by Marvel. The adaptation of the film was reprinted in color to promote a 23-issue series that ran between 1987 and 1992, when the rights were transferred to Dark Horse Comics. Dark Horse released a number of miniseries, including RoboCop Versus The Terminator (1992), which pitted RoboCop against Skynet and its Terminators from The Terminator franchise. The story was well-received and was followed by other series, including Prime Suspect (1992), Roulette (1994) and Mortal Coils (1996). The RoboCop series was continued by Avatar Press (2003), Dynamite Entertainment (2010) and Boom! Studios (2013).

Several games based on, or inspired by, the film have been released. A side-scroller of the same name was released for arcades in 1988, and was ported to other platforms such as the ZX Spectrum and Game Boy. RoboCop Versus The Terminator, an adaptation of the comic of the same name, was released in 1994. RoboCop, a 2003 first-person shooter, was poorly received and resulted in the shuttering of developer Titus Interactive. RoboCop: Rogue City (2023) continues the narrative of RoboCop, being set between RoboCop 2 and RoboCop 3.

== Thematic analysis ==
=== Corporate power ===
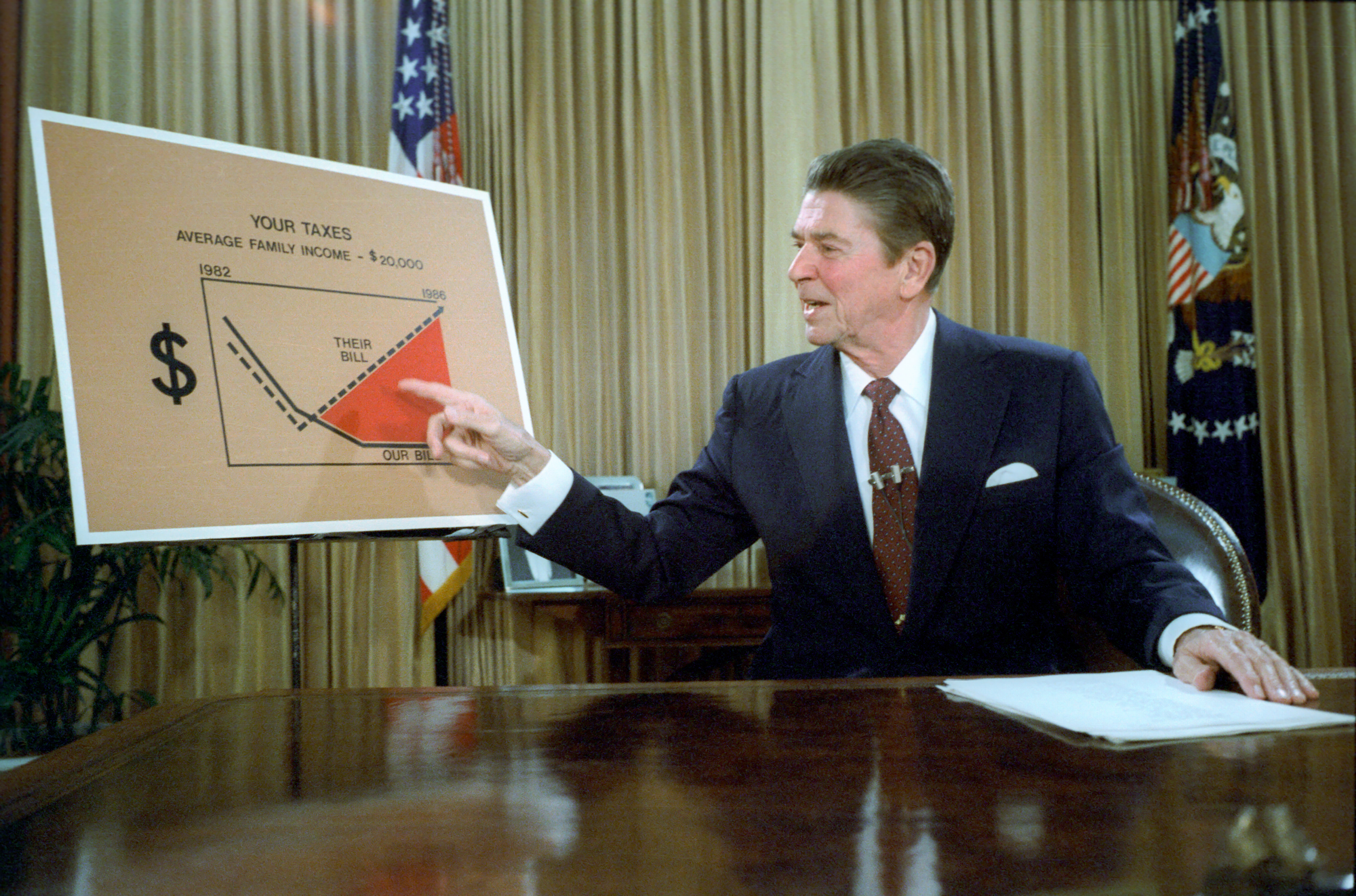
President Ronald Reagan addressing the nation in 1981 on tax reduction. RoboCop satirizes Reagan's political policies espousing limited regulation, supply-side economics and a pro-business agenda.

A central theme in RoboCop is the power of corporations. Those depicted in the film are corrupt and greedy, privatizing public services and gentrifying Detroit. A self-described hippie who grew up during the Watergate scandal and the Vietnam War, Miner was critical of Ronald Reagan's pro-business policies and believed that Detroit was destroyed by American corporations. The Detroit presented in the film is described as beset by rape, crime and "Reaganomics gone awry", where gentrification and unfettered capitalism result in corporations waging war as the police become a profit-driven entity. Miner said that out-of-control crime was a particularly Republican or right-wing fear, but RoboCop puts the blame for drugs and crime on advancing technology and the privatization of public services such as hospitals, prisons and the police. Although criticism of Reagan-era policies was in the script, Verhoeven did not understand urban politics such as the privatization of prisons. Weller said that the "trickle-down economics " he believed were espoused by Reagan were "bullshit" and did not work fast enough for those in need.

Michael Robertson described the Media Breaks throughout the film as direct criticisms of neoliberal Reagan policies. Robertson focused on OCP's claim that it has private ownership of RoboCop, despite making use of Murphy's corpse. The Old Man was based on Reagan, and the corporation's policies emphasize greed and profit over individual rights. The police are deliberately underfunded, and the creation of RoboCop aims to replace them with a more efficient force. Jones admits that it does not matter if ED-209 works, because they have contracts to provide spare parts for years. He plots with Boddicker to corrupt workers brought in to build Delta City with drugs and prostitution. Davison believed that the film is politically liberal, but the violence makes it "fascism for liberals". It takes a pro-labor stance; the police chief, believing in the essential nature of his service, refuses to strike but the underfunded, understaffed and under-assault police eventually walk out. OCP sees the strike as an opportunity to develop more robots.

=== Humanity and death ===
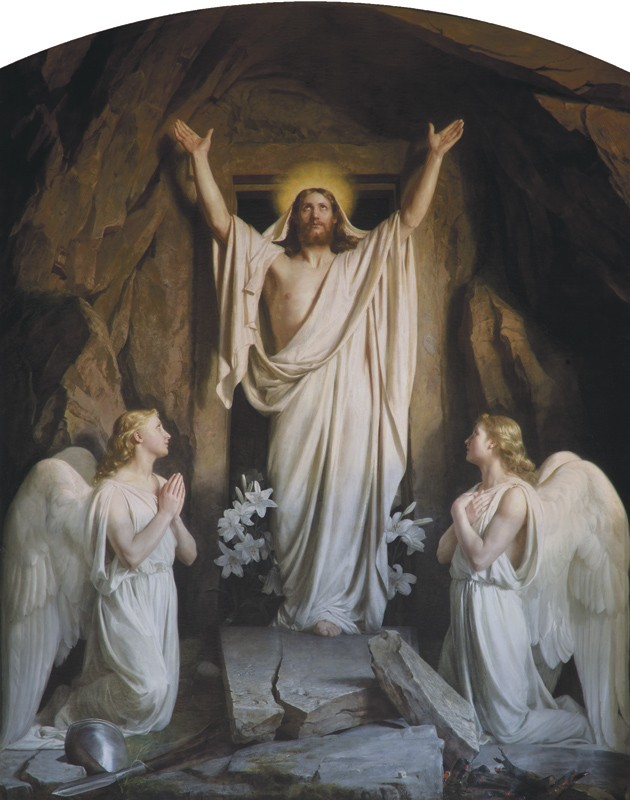
The Resurrection by Carl Heinrich Bloch, 1881. Murphy's transformation into RoboCop is analogous to the crucifixion and resurrection of Jesus.

Another central theme is the question of what humanity is, and how much of Murphy is left in RoboCop. Neumeier wanted to leave audiences asking "what's left" of Murphy, and described the character's journey as coping with his transformation. As an officer, Murphy works for a corporation that insists it owns individuals based on waivers and can do what it wants with Murphy's remains. He does the right thing, however, and fights against the demands of his corporate masters. Despite his inhuman appearance, RoboCop has a soul, experiences real human fears, and has a core consciousness that makes him more than a machine. Brooks Landon says that Murphy is dead, however; although he remembers Murphy's life, RoboCop is not (and can never be) Murphy and regain enough of his humanity to rejoin his family. Dale Bradley writes that RoboCop is a machine who mistakenly thinks it is Murphy because of its composite parts, and only believes it has a human spirit within. An alternative view is that RoboCop's personality is a new construct, informed partially by fragments of Murphy's personality. Slavoj Žižek describes Murphy as a man between life and death, who is deceased and simultaneously reanimated with mechanical parts. As he regains his humanity, he transforms from being programmed by others to his former state as a being of desire. Žižek calls this return of the living dead a fundamental human fantasy, a desire to avoid death and take revenge against the living.

Murphy's death is prolonged and violent, so the audience can see RoboCop as imbued with the humanity taken from him by Boddicker's gang and OCP. Verhoeven considered it important to acknowledge the inherent darkness of humanity to avoid inevitable mutual destruction. He was affected by his childhood experiences during World War II and the inhuman actions he witnessed. Verhoeven believed that the concept of an immaculate hero died after the war, and subsequent heroes had a dark side they had to overcome. Describing the difference between making films in Europe and America, Verhoeven said that a European RoboCop would explore the spiritual and psychological problems of RoboCop's condition; the American version focuses on revenge. He incorporated Christian mythology into the film; Murphy's brutal death is analogous to the crucifixion of Jesus before his resurrection as RoboCop, an American Jesus who walks on water at the steel mill and wields a handgun. Verhoeven said that he did not believe in the resurrection of Jesus, but "[he] can see the value of that idea, the purity of that idea. So from an artistic point of view, it's absolutely true". The scene of RoboCop returning to Murphy's home is compared to finding the Garden of Eden or a similar paradise.

Brooks Landon describes the film as typical of the cyberpunk genre because it does not treat RoboCop as better or worse than average humans (just different), and asks the audience to consider him a new life form. The film does not treat this technological advance as necessarily negative, just an inevitable result of a progression that will change one's life and one's understanding of what it means to be human. The RoboCop character embodies the struggle of humanity to embrace technology. The central cast do not have romantic interests or overt sexual desires. Paul Sammon described the scene of RoboCop shooting bottles of baby food as symbolic of the relationship he and Lewis can never have. Taylor agreed, but believed that the confrontation between Morton and Jones in the OCP bathroom was sexualized.

=== Masculinity and authority ===
Vince Mancini describes the 1980s as a period in which cinematic heroes were unambiguously good, as depicted in films that promoted suburban living, materialism and unambiguous villains such as Raiders of the Lost Ark (1981) and Back to the Future (1985). Some films of the decade send the message that authority is good and trustworthy, but RoboCop demonstrates that those in authority are flawed and Detroit has been carved up by greed, capitalism and cheap foreign labor. Weller described RoboCop as an evolution of strait-laced 1940s heroes such as Gary Cooper and Jimmy Stewart, who lived honorably; modern audiences now cheer a maimed police officer taking brutal revenge.

Susan Jeffords considers RoboCop among the many "hard body" films of the decade that portray perfect, strong, masculine physiques who must protect the "soft bodies": the ineffectual and the weak. RoboCop portrays strength by eliminating crime and redeeming the city through violence. Bullets ricochet harmlessly off his armor; attempts to attack his crotch (a typical weak point) only hurt the attacker, demonstrating the uncompromising strength and masculinity needed to eliminate crime. According to Darian Leader, the addition of something unnatural to a biological body is required to be truly masculine. RoboCop's body incorporates technology, a symbolic addition that makes him more than an average man.

== Legacy ==
=== Cultural influence ===
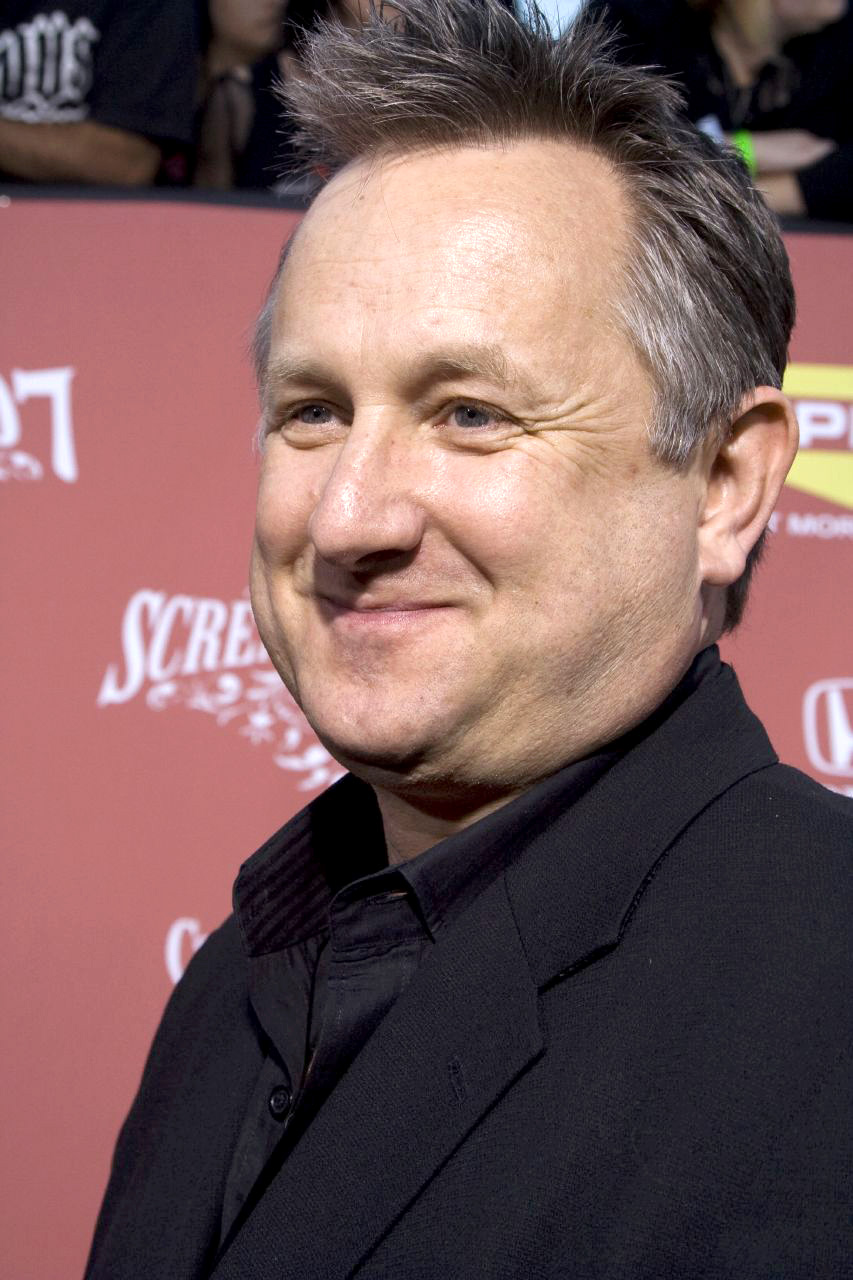
Writer Edward Neumeier's (pictured in 2007) interest in science fiction and work on Blade Runner (1982) inspired RoboCop. His work on that film led to his employment by the United States Air Force as a consultant for futuristic concepts.

RoboCop is considered a groundbreaking entry in the science-fiction genre. Unlike many protagonists at the time, the film's central character is not a robotic-like human who is stoic and invincible but a human-like robot who is affected by his lost humanity. In a 2013 interview following Detroit's bankruptcy and the city's labeling as the most dangerous place in the United States, Neumeier spoke about the film's prescience: "We are now living in the world that I was proposing in RoboCop ... how big corporations will take care of us and ... how they won't." Verhoeven described RoboCop as a film ahead of its time, which could not be improved with digital effects.

The film's impact was not limited to North America, and Neumeier recalled finding unlicensed RoboCop dolls for sale near the Colosseum in Rome. He has said that many robotics labs use a "Robo-" prefix for projects in reference to the film, and he was hired as a United States Air Force consultant for futuristic concepts because of his involvement with RoboCop. In the years immediately after its release, Verhoeven parlayed his success into directing the science-fiction film Total Recall (1990, also with Cox) and the erotic thriller Basic Instinct (1992). He also worked with Neumeier on the tonally-similar science-fiction film Starship Troopers (1997). In 2020, the Guardian's Scott Tobias wrote that in hindsight, RoboCop was the beginning of Verhoeven's unofficial science-fiction trilogy about authoritarian governance (followed by Total Recall and Starship Troopers). Previously typecast as someone who played moral characters, Cox credited RoboCop with changing his image and—with the Beverly Hills Cop films—boosting his film career to make him one of the decade's most iconic villains.

The RoboCop, ED-209 and Clarence Boddicker characters are considered iconic. (Note: Attributed to multiple references:) Lines such as RoboCop's "Dead or alive, you're coming with me", ED-209's "You have 20 seconds to comply" and television host Bixby Snyder's "I'd buy that for a dollar" are among the film's most recognizable. (Note: Attributed to multiple references:) The film has been referred to in a variety of media, from television (including Family Guy, It's Always Sunny in Philadelphia, Red Dwarf, South Park, and The Simpsons) to films (including Hot Shots! Part Deux and Ready Player One) and video games (Deus Ex and its prequel, Deus Ex: Human Revolution). Doom Eternal (2020) creative director Hugo Martin cited it as an inspiration. RoboCop (voiced by Weller) is a playable character in the fighting game Mortal Kombat 11 (2019). The character was a design inspiration for the Nintendo Power Glove (1989), and appeared in advertisements for KFC in 2019 (again voiced by Weller), and Direct Line in 2020 with the Teenage Mutant Ninja Turtles and Bumblebee.

For the 30th anniversary of RoboCop's release in 2017, Weller attended a screening by Alamo Drafthouse Cinema at Dallas City Hall (in his home town) and called the film an homage to the city. The crowdfunded making-of documentary RoboDoc: The Creation of RoboCop was released in August 2023. It covers the production and influence of RoboCop, with interviews of many of the cast and crew involved.

In 2025, a 10-to-11-foot (3.0 to 3.4 m) RoboCop statue was permanently installed in Eastern Market, Detroit. First proposed in 2011, over $67,000 was crowdfunded for its construction.

=== Modern reception ===
RoboCop has been called one of the best science-fiction and action films of all time, (Note: Attributed to multiple references:) and among the best films of the 1980s. (Note: Attributed to multiple references:) Several publications have listed it as one of the greatest action films of all time: On review aggregator Rotten Tomatoes, it has an 84% approval rating based on 184 reviews. According to the website, "A darkly ironic blast of comic book sci-fi, RoboCop fuses scabrous political satire with dazzling action and outrageous gore, rising above its bone-crunching premise through sharp humor, sleek visuals, and an unexpectedly mythical edge." Rotten Tomatoes listed the film at number 139 on its list of 200 essential movies to watch, and one of 300 essential movies. The film has a score of 70 out of 100 on Metacritic based on 17 "generally favorable reviews". In the 2000s, The New York Times listed it as one of its 1,000 "Best Movies Ever", and Empire ranked the film number 404 on its list of the 500 greatest movies of all time.

Filmmakers have spoken about their appreciation for RoboCop and cited it as an inspiration in their own careers, including Anna Boden and Ryan Fleck, Neill Blomkamp, Leigh Whannell and Ken Russell, who called it the best science fiction film since Fritz Lang's Metropolis (1927). During the COVID-19 pandemic, it was among the action films recommended by director James Gunn.

== Sequels and adaptations ==
By November 1987, Orion had greenlit the development of a sequel targeting a PG rating, which would allow children to see the film unaccompanied by adults, and tying into the 12-episode animated series RoboCop, released by Marvel Productions in 1988. Neumeier and Miner began writing the film but were fired after refusing to work during the 1988 Writers Guild of America strike and were replaced by Frank Miller, whose second draft was made into RoboCop 2 and first draft became the second sequel, RoboCop 3. Weller reprised his role in the Irvin Kershner–directed first sequel, which was released to mixed reviews and was estimated to have lost money.

RoboCop 3, directed by Fred Dekker, was targeted at younger audiences who were driving merchandise sales. Robert John Burke replaced Weller in the title role, and Allen returned as Anne Lewis for the third and final time in the series. The film was a critical and financial failure.

A live-action television series was released in 1994, but had a poor critical reception and was canceled after 22 episodes. Starring Richard Eden as RoboCop, the series used aspects of Neumeier and Miner's RoboCop 2 ideas. A second animated series, RoboCop: Alpha Commando, followed in 1998. Page Fletcher starred as RoboCop in a four-part live-action miniseries, RoboCop: Prime Directives (2001). The series, set ten years after the events of the first film, ignores the events of the sequels. After years of financial difficulties, Orion and the rights to RoboCop were purchased by MGM in the late 1990s.

A 2014 reboot of the first film, also called RoboCop, was directed by José Padilha and starred Joel Kinnaman. The film received mixed reviews, but was a financial success. Verhoeven said that he "should be dead" before a reboot was attempted, and Allen believed that an "iconic" film should not be remade. RoboCop Returns, a sequel to RoboCop that ignores the series' other films, was announced to be in development in 2019. However, MGM was purchased by Amazon in 2022, and a television series was announced in 2024. In August 2026, Dan Stevens was cast as Alex Murphy/RoboCop.
