= Jeremy Davidson =

Jeremy Davidson may refer to:

- Jeremy Davidson (actor) (born 1971), American actor, writer and director
- Jeremy Davidson (rugby union) (born 1974), rugby union lock
