= Michael Miner =

American film director and screenwriter

- Occupations: Film director, screenwriter
- Years active: 1979–present

Michael Miner is an American film director and screenwriter. He is best known for co-writing the 1987 film RoboCop. Along with Edward Neumeier, he co-created the characters Officer Alex Murphy/RoboCop and ED-209 in the film.

In 1989, Miner directed and wrote the science fiction film Deadly Weapon, starring Rodney Eastman, and in 1999, he directed the drama film The Book of Stars, starring Mary Stuart Masterson and Jena Malone. Aside from film directing, he directed music videos for the rock bands Y&T and Night Ranger.
