= Kate Brasher =

American drama television series

- Genre: Drama
- Created by: Stephen Tolkin
- Starring: Mary Stuart Masterson; Hector Elizondo; Gregory Smith; Mason Gamble; Rhea Perlman
- Theme music composer: Nathan Barr; Lisbeth Scott
- Country of origin: United States
- Original language: English
- No. of seasons: 1
- No. of episodes: 6

Production
- Executive producers: Danny DeVito; John Landgraf; Stacey Sher; Stephen Tolkin
- Producers: Mary Stuart Masterson; Cyrus I. Yavneh
- Cinematography: Gordon Lonsdale
- Running time: 60 minutes
- Production companies: Jersey Television; CBS Productions; 20th Century Fox Television

Original release
- Network: CBS
- Release: February 24 – April 14, 2001

Kate Brasher is an American drama television series created by Stephen Tolkin, that was broadcast on CBS from February 24 until April 14, 2001. It premiered at 9:00pm ET/PT on Saturday, February 24, 2001, and was cancelled after six episodes.

== Overview ==
The title character was the single mother of teenaged sons Daniel and Elvis living in Santa Monica, California. Facing a financial crisis, she seeks legal advice at Brothers Keepers, an inner city community advocacy center, and is offered a job as a social worker. Her co-workers include attorney Abbie Schaeffer and Joe Almeida, the organization's street-smart director, who founded it after his daughter was killed in gang crossfire.

== Cast ==
- Mary Stuart Masterson as Kate Brasher
- Hector Elizondo as Joe Almeida
- Gregory Smith as Daniel Brasher, Kate's first son
- Mason Gamble as Elvis Brasher, Kate's second son
- Rhea Perlman as Abbie Schaeffer
- Roger Robinson as Earl

Among those actors making guest appearances during the series' short run were K Callan, Dennis Christopher, Paul Dooley, Mariette Hartley, Josh Hopkins, Carl Lumbly, Spencer Breslin, David Naughton and Mackenzie Phillips.

== Development and production ==
Series creator Stephen Tolkin based the character of Almeida on Rabbi Mark Borovitz, an ex-convict and alcoholic who became the spiritual leader of Gateways Beit T'Shuvah, a residential treatment center for Jews in recovery from alcohol and drug addiction. The two men met when Tolkin contacted the rabbi for help with a friend who was dealing with substance abuse.

Although set in Santa Monica, California, the series was shot on location in San Diego, California.

== Episodes ==
| No. | Title | Directed by | Written by | Original release date | Prod. code |
|---|---|---|---|---|---|
| 1 | "Kate" "Pilot" | James Frawley | Stephen Tolkin | February 24, 2001 | 1AEA01 |
| 2 | "Simon" | Jerry Levine | Written by : Joel Fields, Stephen Tolkin; Story by : John Landgraf, Joel Fields, Stephen Tolkin | March 3, 2001 | 1AEA04 |
| 3 | "Jeff" | Steve Robman | Joel Fields, Stephen Tolkin | March 10, 2001 | 1AEA06 |
| 4 | "Jackson" | Joe Napolitano | Phil Penningroth | March 24, 2001 | 1AEA05 |
| 5 | "Tracy" | Arvin Brown | Stephen Tolkin | April 7, 2001 | 1AEA02 |
| 6 | "Georgia" | Steve Miner | Dana Baratta | April 14, 2001 | 1AEA03 |

== Critical reception ==
''Kate Brasher'' received mixed-to-negative reviews. Critics often praised Mary Stuart Masterson's performance and the series' intentions while finding its storytelling didactic and its characters overly schematic.

Anita Gates of the New York Times wrote that the series had an appealing cast and generally did not insult viewers intelligence, but that its characters were "100 percent good" figures who delivered self-righteous speeches. She argued that the show strained to be quirky, to create a chaotic atmosphere reminiscent of "ER" and to be both uplifting and cynical.

Ken Tucker of Entertainment Weekly described it as mixing an "Eri Brockovich" vibe with a "Touched by an Angel" aura and called the result "hokum thats beneath [Masterson's] talents"

Joan Ostrow of The Denver Post found it more self-righteous and preachy than CBS's "That's Life", likening the tone to "Touched by a Social Worker"

Scott D. Pierce of the Deseret News wrote that the serise was "loaded with good intentions" but "heavy-handed and cliched"
