= Nikki Silver =

American television producer

Nikki Silver is an American television and film producer. She has won five Emmy Awards for Reading Rainbow in 2007, 2005, 2003, 2002, and 2001.

== Career ==
Silver previously ran the company On Screen Entertainment until 2012 when she founded ToniK Productions with her partner Tonya Lewis Lee. ToniK is best known for its films, The Giver, The Watsons Go to Birmingham and the upcoming Monster. She has been producing film and television for 25 years. She began her career in children's media producing Reading Rainbow, the award-winning series for PBS, Reading Rainbow won the Emmy Award five times, Peabody, and Prix Jeunesse.

Silver has produced for many networks on a variety of scripted and documentary programming. What's Going On? was a documentary series produced in association with the United Nations for Showtime Networks and hosted by top celebrity activists including Michael Douglas, Angelina Jolie, Richard Gere and Laurence Fishburne. Teenage Witness aired nationally on PBS in 2011 followed an 83-year-old Holocaust survivor, Fanya Heller, as she shares her unique story with inner city teenagers. Richard Gere provided the voice-over for the film, which played at several film festivals. Silver also produced the 2011 American Masters film, Jeff Bridges: The Dude Abides, on the life and family of Jeff Bridges. And Miracle's Boys, a live–action mini-series based on Jacqueline Woodson's novel which premiered on MTV's the N. Directed by Spike Lee, Ernest Dickerson, LeVar Burton and Bill Duke, the series chronicled the life of three orphaned teens struggling to keep their family together. Miracle's Boys was the first series she produced with Lewis Lee.

Silver produced, The Zack Files, a fifty-two episode live action teen comedy based on the book series of the same name which aired on ABC Family. Other series she produced include The Puzzle Place, Backyard Safari and Outward Bound USA. Silver has won five Emmy awards and numerous other accolades for her television work.

== Personal life ==
Nikki Silver was born in New York City to Joan Kanstoren and Sylvan Schefler. Her father was an investment banker and her mother worked at NBC. She has two sisters Dawn Spiera, a television producer and Hope Taitz, an entrepreneur and advocate. She earned a BA from the University of Pennsylvania, where she met her husband, Brad Silver. She has three sons and still resides in New York City. Silver is actively involved with University of Pennsylvania having taken seats on different boards and committees. She and her husband, a board member of the Netter Center, support the community initiatives in West Philadelphia. When her oldest son was diagnosed with hydrocephalus, she got involved with the Hydrocephalus Association and their research initiatives. While living in South Africa to film The Giver, Ms. Silver joined the advisory board of LALELA, an organization that provides educational arts for at risk kids to inspire creativity.

== Filmography ==
=== Television series ===
- Reading Rainbow (1983-2006)
- The Puzzle Place (1995-1998)
- Backyard Safari
- Outward Bound (1999-2003)
- The Zack Files (2000-2002)
- Miracle's Boys (2005)
- What's Going On? (2003-2011)
- That's What I'm Talking About (2006)
- American Masters: The Dude Abides (2011)

=== Film ===
- Teenage Witness: The Fanya Heller Story (2010)
- The Watson's Go To Birmingham (2013)
- The Giver (2014)
- Monster (2018)
- Premature (2019)
- Rain Reign (2026)
