= Rain Reign =

- Directed by: Erika Burke Rossa
- Screenplay by: Erika Burke Rossa
- Based on: Rain Reign by Ann M. Martin
- Produced by: Julie Rudd; Nikki Silver; Erika Burke Rossa; Robin Jonas; Jonathan Lim; Theresa Steele Page
- Starring: Paul Rudd; Jeremy Sisto; Felice Kakaletris; Gretchen Mol; Mary Stuart Masterson; Jeremy Davidson; C. J. Wilson
- Cinematography: Tami Reiker
- Edited by: Joe Klotz
- Music by: Eric D. Johnson
- Production companies: City Hill Arts; Ley Line Entertainment; Lost Winds Entertainment; Poster Child Pictures; Twist/Long Odds/Rainbow Goat Production
- Release date: June 6, 2026 (Tribeca Festival)
- Running time: 100 minutes
- Country: United States
- Language: English

Rain Reign is a 2026 American drama film written, produced, and directed by Erika Burke Rossa (in her feature film directorial debut). It is based on the 2014 novel by Ann M. Martin, and stars Paul Rudd, Jeremy Sisto, Felice Kakaletris, Gretchen Mol, Mary Stuart Masterson, Jeremy Davidson, and C. J. Wilson.

The film premiered at the Tribeca Festival on June 6, 2026.

== Premise ==
Rose is a 12-year-old, neurodivergent girl cared for by her struggling single dad and well-meaning uncle. When her beloved dog goes missing during a superstorm, she embarks on a search that will test her family's bonds and her own resilience.

== Cast ==
- Paul Rudd as Weldon
- Jeremy Sisto as Wesley
- Felice Kakaletris as Rose Howard
- Gretchen Mol as Julie Caporale
- Mary Stuart Masterson as Mrs. Henderson
- Jeremy Davidson as Mr. Henderson
- C. J. Wilson as Sam Diamond

== Production ==
In March 2025, it was reported that an adaptation of the 2014 novel Rain Reign by Ann M. Martin was in development, with Erika Burke Rossa writing, producing, and directing, and Paul Rudd starring in the lead role. Filming wrapped in July 2025, when Jeremy Sisto, Felice Kakaletris, Gretchen Mol, Mary Stuart Masterson, Jeremy Davidson, and C. J. Wilson rounded out the cast.

== Release ==
Rain Reign premiered at the Tribeca Festival on June 6, 2026.

== Reception ==
Rain Reign received positive reviews.
