= Immediate Family (film) =

1989 drama film directed by Jonathan Kaplan

- Theatrical release poster
- Directed by: Jonathan Kaplan
- Written by: Barbara Benedek
- Produced by: Lawrence Kasdan; Sarah Pillsbury; Midge Sanford
- Starring: Glenn Close; James Woods; Mary Stuart Masterson; Kevin Dillon
- Cinematography: John Lindley
- Edited by: Jane Kurson
- Music by: Brad Fiedel
- Distributed by: Columbia Pictures
- Release date: 27 October 1989
- Running time: 95 minutes
- Country: United States
- Language: English
- Budget: $14 million
- Box office: $5,932,613

Immediate Family is a 1989 drama film directed by Jonathan Kaplan. It stars Glenn Close and James Woods as a married childless couple who want a baby. They decide to adopt from a pregnant teenage girl played by Mary Stuart Masterson who later has second thoughts.

== Plot ==
Successful couple Michael and Linda Spector (James Woods and Glenn Close) have been married for ten years and desperately want to be parents. They try to conceive but are unable. They turn to an adoption agency and meet the pregnant 17-year-old Lucy (Mary Stuart Masterson). She thinks the couple can provide better for her baby than she and her boyfriend Sam (Kevin Dillon). The Spectors take care of Lucy during her pregnancy and they become close but Lucy becomes uncertain about giving up her baby.

== Cast ==
- Glenn Close as Linda Spector
- James Woods as Michael Spector
- Mary Stuart Masterson as Lucy
- Kevin Dillon as Sam
- Linda Darlow as Lawyer Susan Drew
- Harrison Mohr as Eli
- Mimi Kennedy as Eli's mother
- Charles Levin as Eli's father
- Jessica James as Bessie
- Ken Lerner as Josh
- Jane Greer as Michael's Mother
- Veena Sood as Admitting Nurse

== Critical reception ==
Immediate Family received mixed reviews from critics, as the film holds a 54% critics rating on Rotten Tomatoes from 13 reviews.

Film critic Roger Ebert wrote that the "casting, indeed, is the only way in which 'Immediate Family' transcends the predictable formula of its screenplay", that "the movie as a whole failed to really reach me", and that "the characters in [the film are] too familiar. (Like all characters on TV and in the movies, they never watch TV or go to the movies and so are unaware that their lives are made of cliches.)" Writing in The Washington Post, Rita Kempley noted that "Masterson gives an honest, unpretentious performance" but added "this is a movie with an '80s ethic, which turns adoption into something approximating a corporate takeover" and "'Immediate Family' seems to say [adoption is] not such a big deal after all: Give the first one away and have another after you've established your career."

== Awards and nominations ==
National Board of Review of Motion Pictures

- 1989: Won, "Best Supporting Actress" - Mary Stuart Masterson

Young Artist Award

- 1990: Nominated, "Best Young Actor Supporting Role in a Motion Picture" - Kevin Dillon
