= On the 2nd Day of Christmas =

- Written by: Brian Hohlfeld
- Directed by: James Frawley
- Starring: Mary Stuart Masterson; Mark Ruffalo; Lauren Pratt; David Hewlett; James Purcell
- Music by: David Bergeaud
- Country of origin: United States
- Original language: English

Production
- Producer: John Ryan
- Cinematography: William Wages
- Editor: Chip Masamitsu
- Running time: 96 min.
- Production companies: ABC Pictures; Goldenring Productions

Original release
- Network: Lifetime
- Release: December 8, 1997

On the 2nd Day of Christmas is a 1997 Lifetime television movie starring Mary Stuart Masterson and Mark Ruffalo, directed by James Frawley.

== Plot ==
Small-time thieves 29-year-old Trish (Mary Stuart Masterson) and her 6-year-old niece Patsy (Lauren Suzanne Pratt) are at a diner, planning their next heist. Patsy tells her Aunt Trish that it's wrong that they are pick-pocketing people, but Trish believes it's okay in some way, and tells her that they only steal from "those who can afford it", and also mails back the wallets still containing the ID back to the people who she stole them from.

Trish's former beau Mel (David Hewlett) comes to the diner to talk to Trish, being chased by two guys to whom he owes money. Trish and Patsy leave to go to Limbers department store. Patsy puts on a blond wig and begins to pick-pocket Mr. Limber (Lawrence Dane), the owner of the store. They are caught by security guard Bert (Mark Ruffalo).

Trish and Patsy are brought to the office of Limber and threatened with arrest. But since it is almost Christmas, it's late Friday, and Social Services is already closed, Bert is to keep a watch over them at his place, though he protests doing so. After Christmas, on December 26, he is to return them back to the office, when Patsy is to be given to a foster-family who can better look out for her interests and Trish is to face charges.

As the hours go by, Trish and Bert begin to develop an attraction for each other. As Christmas is "ruined" for Trish and Patsy, Bert takes them to Maplewood for his family's holiday dinner, and then to "Santa's Castle" where Patsy confesses her bad deeds to Santa's head elf (Howard Hesseman) and writes Santa a note, asking him to deliver her bicycle to Bert's apartment, where they've been staying.

Very early in the morning on December 26, Bert rushes to Limbers to buy the bicycle, and Patsy is elated to find it delivered later that morn. But then Patsy is kidnapped by Mel, who wants to use her to pick-pocket at Limbers during the after-Christmas crowd's rush to return gifts. He is caught by Bert and everyone ends up back in the office where Social Services officials await them. But with Patsy's wish coming true, they get a second chance. Mel is hauled off to jail. Bert quits his job and proposes to Trish.

== Cast ==
- Mary Stuart Masterson as Patricia "Trish" Tracy
- Mark Ruffalo as Albert "Bert" Sanders
- Lauren Suzanne Pratt as Patsy Tracy
- David Hewlett as Mel
- James Purcell as Bill
- Lawrence Dane as Mr. Limber
- Howard Hesseman as David
- Arlene Meadows as Mom

== See also ==
- List of Christmas films
