= The Cake Eaters =

2007 film by Mary Stuart Masterson

- Theatrical release poster
- Directed by: Mary Stuart Masterson
- Written by: Jayce Bartok
- Produced by: Allen Bain; Elisa Pugliese
- Starring: Kristen Stewart; Aaron Stanford; Jayce Bartok; Bruce Dern; Elizabeth Ashley; Miriam Shor
- Cinematography: Peter Masterson
- Edited by: Joe Landauer; Colleen Sharp
- Music by: Duncan Sheik
- Production companies: Vinyl Foote Productions; The 7th Floor
- Distributed by: 7-57 Releasing
- Release dates: April 29, 2007 (Tribeca Film Festival); March 13, 2009 (United States)
- Running time: 86 minutes
- Country: United States
- Language: English

The Cake Eaters is a 2007 American independent drama film about two small-town families who must confront old issues with the return of one family's son. The film was directed by Mary Stuart Masterson (in her feature film directorial debut), and stars Kristen Stewart, Aaron Stanford, Bruce Dern and Jayce Bartok. Stewart plays Georgia, a young girl with Friedreich's ataxia, a rare disease for which there is no cure.

The Cake Eaters premiered at the Tribeca Film Festival on April 29, 2007, and earned a theatrical release on March 13, 2009. The film earned mixed reviews from critics, who praised Masterson's direction and the performances but criticized the screenplay.

== Cast ==
- Kristen Stewart as Georgia Kaminski
- Aaron Stanford as Beagle Kimbrough
- Bruce Dern as Easy Kimbrough
- Elizabeth Ashley as Marg
- Jayce Bartok as Guy Kimbrough
- Miriam Shor as Stephanie
- Talia Balsam as Violet Kaminski, Georgia's mother
- Jesse L. Martin as Judd, Violet's boyfriend
- Melissa Leo as Ceci

== Production ==
Principal photography of this film began in May 2006 in New York.

In an interview at the Austin Film Festival in 2007, Jayce Bartok, the movie's screenwriter, was asked about the title's meaning. Bartok is quoted as saying, "The Cake Eaters is a term I grew up with in Pennsylvania. My mom used to use it to describe those who had it made, had their lives mapped out for them, were the most likely to succeed… 'The Cake Eaters.' I thought it was an interesting metaphor for this group of misfits who begin the story searching and longing for love, trying to overcome grief, and through the course of the story… find their 'cake.' They find some love, happiness, peace…." The term was widely popularized as a quote from the 1992 film The Mighty Ducks.

== Release ==
The Cake Eaters opened at the Tribeca Film Festival on April 29, 2007, and made the rounds of the independent film circuit, premiering at various film festivals such as the Woodstock Film Festival, Lone Star International Film Festival, Fort Lauderdale International Film Festival. It was eventually given a limited theatrical release on March 13, 2009, and debuted on DVD on March 24, 2009.

== Reception ==
=== Critical reception ===
The Cake Eaters holds a "fresh" rating of 64% at Rotten Tomatoes based on 25 reviews with an average rating of 6.01/10. The site's critics consensus reads, "Though light on theme and craftsmanship, The Cake Eaters relies on fine performances and brisk direction to provide an affecting tale of small-town life." Metacritic, which uses a weighted average, assigned the film a score of 60 out of 100, based on 10 critics, indicating "mixed or average" reviews.

Roger Ebert of the Chicago Sun-Times, who gave it three out of four stars, praised Masterson for a good debut. Stephen Holden of The New York Times called it a "small, overcrowded ensemble piece" that is "elevated" by "superior acting" into "something deeper". Other critics, such as Rex Reed of the New York Observer, Bill Goodykoontz of the Arizona Republic, and V.A. Musetto of the New York Post, also gave favorable reviews, with Musetto, in particular, lamenting the fact that it had taken two years for the film to be released theatrically.

Not all reception was positive however, with Erin Trahan of the Boston Globe, Gary Goldstein of the Los Angeles Times, and Aaron Hillis of Village Voice, among others, giving it negative reviews. Goldstein, in particular, was sharply critical of what he described as "a bland ensemble drama with an unremarkable script."

=== Awards ===
- People's Choice Award for Best American Indie Film - 2007 Ft. Lauderdale International Film Festival
- Audience Award for a Dramatic Feature - 2008 Ashland Independent Film Festival
- Discovery Award - 2008 Sedona International Film Festival
- Best Feature - 2008 Stony Brook Film Festival
