= The Book of Stars =

- DVD cover
- Directed by: Michael Miner
- Written by: Tasca Shadix
- Produced by: David Skinner; Larry Estes
- Starring: Mary Stuart Masterson; Jena Malone
- Cinematography: James J. Whitaker
- Edited by: Brian Berdan
- Music by: Richard Gibbs
- Distributed by: Winstar Home Video
- Release date: 1999
- Running time: 111 minutes
- Country: United States
- Language: English

The Book of Stars is a 1999 American drama film directed by Michael Miner and starring Mary Stuart Masterson and Jena Malone as two sisters, both of whom are on the down slopes of their lives but in entirely different ways. It received its world premiere as part of the 1999 South by Southwest Film Festival.

== Plot ==
Penny and Mary are sisters living together in a tenement apartment in a seedy section of an unnamed city. The responsibility of caring for fifteen-year-old Mary has fallen on Penny due to the death of their parents years before.

Mary has cystic fibrosis, and her lung function is deteriorating. She spends most of her time indoors and records her life, dream and hopes in an artistic scrapbook she calls Book of Stars and Lovely Things. in it, she depicts herself as an astronaut adrift in space, drifting toward the sun. Penny is a former poet who has turned to prostitution and drugs, which she use to cope with her job and the expected loss of her sister.

There is a quiet young man who has moved in next door. He is from war-torn Eastern Europe and walks with a limp. Penny gets a letter from a prisoner, who was moved by her poetry and writes her admiring letters. She won't answer, or even read the letters, so Mary does it for her.

Mary arranges things and events to keep her sister human.

== Cast ==
Actor	Role
Mary Stuart Masterson	Penny
Jena Malone	Mary
Delroy Lindo	Professor
Karl Geary	Kristjan
D. B. Sweeney	Prisoner
Gina Nagy	Prisoner's Wife

== Soundtrack ==
The soundtrack was released on August 23, 2005 on La-La Land Records.

The Book of Stars: Original Motion Picture Soundtrack

Soundtrack album by various artists
- Released: August 23, 2005
- Genres: Soundtrack; Indian classical music
- Length: 59:49
- Label: La-La Land Records

Professional ratings
Review scores
Source	Rating
Music from the Movies	4/5 stars
SoundtrackNet	3/5 stars

=== Track listing ===
1. "Main Title" – 3:03
2. "The Meeting / Refuge" – 2:23
3. "The Prisoner's First Letter / Mary's Dream" – 3:18
4. "Painted Lady / Mary's World / The Fight" – 3:32
5. "New Friend" – 1:40
6. "Storm Warnings" – 4:35
7. "Tellmeaboutthebeach / Ticklefight / Solar Plunge" – 4:04
8. "Picnic" – 2:41
9. "Overdose / Grim Reaper / The Hospital" – 4:51
10. "Torn Letter" – 4:56
11. "Happy Birthday" – 1:57
12. "Samuel's Story" – 2:51
13. "The Book is Finished / Afterlife / The Beach" – 5:44
14. "Transcendence" – 3:42
15. "End Credits" – 4:52
16. "Alternate End Credits" – 5:40

== Critical reception ==
Writing in Variety, critic Robert Koehler described the film as "self-consciously covered in every last New Age decoration — posing as art, but utterly manipulative underneath" with "baroque, bloated visual symbolism" and "an unfortunately jejune tone," and noted that Malone is a "game young actor [who] conjures up genuine sadness" but that "Masterson is much less successful at finding what’s inside Penny, and the script hardly helps."

== Awards ==
Award	Result	Category	Recipient
DVD Exclusive Awards	Won	Best Original Score	Richard Gibbs
DVD Exclusive Awards	Won	Best Supporting Actress	Jena Malone
DVD Exclusive Awards	Nominated	Best Actress	Mary Stuart Masterson
Ojai Film Festival	Won	Best Narrative Feature	Michael Miner
Stony Brook Film Festival	Won	Best Feature	Michael Miner
