= David Skinner (producer) =

Film and Theatre Producer

David Skinner (born January 1946) is a Film and Theatre Producer.

== Information ==
David Skinner is owner/manager of ShadowCatcher Entertainment LLC which has been developing, producing and investing in Film and Theatre productions since 2003. Film Credits include Smoke Signals (Audience Award Winner, Sundance Film Festival; in 2018 the film was selected for preservation in the National Film Registry for being "culturally, historically, or aesthetically significant, and was enlisted in the National Library of Congress). Outsourced was adapted as an American sitcom television series for Universal Media Studios and NBC. Broadway productions include Moulin Rouge!, Ain't Too Proud, The Inheritance, The Ferryman, as well as Tony-winners Come From Away, Dear Evan Hansen, Memphis, Vanya, Sonia, Masha and Spike, and Gentleman’s Guide. Off-Broadway: Satchmo at the Waldorf, Buyer and Cellar, My Name is Asher Lev, and The Absolute Brightness of Leonard Pelkey.

== Theater ==
- The Inheritance (2019) (investor)
- Moulin Rouge! The Musical (2019) (investor)
- Ain't Too Proud (musical) (2019) (investor)
- The Cher Show (2018) (investor)
- The Ferryman (2018) (investor)
- Come from Away (2015) (investor)
- Dear Evan Hansen (2015) (investor)
- A Gentleman's Guide to Love and Murder (2013) (producer)
- Vanya and Sonia and Masha and Spike (2012) (investor)
- Memphis (2009) (investor)

== Filmography ==
- Keep On Keeping On (2014) (executive producer)
- A Not So Still Life (2010) (executive producer)
- Outsourced (2007) (executive producer)
- American Pastime (2007) (executive producer)
- Game 6 (2005) (executive producer)
- Getting to Know You (1999) (executive producer)
- The Book of Stars (1999) (executive producer)
- Smoke Signals (1998) (executive producer)
