= Jeremy Davidson (actor) =

American actor, writer and director

- Born: Jeremy Michael Greenberg; December 24, 1971 (age 54)
- Occupations: Actor; writer; director
- Spouse: Mary Stuart Masterson (m. 2006)
- Children: 4
- Relatives: Carlin Glynn (mother-in-law); Peter Masterson (father-in-law)

Jeremy Davidson (born Jeremy Michael Greenberg; December 24, 1971) is an American actor, writer, and director.

== Career ==
He has been featured as Jack Randall, Kitty's love interest in the television series Brothers & Sisters. He appeared in five seasons of the Lifetime series Army Wives as MSG Chase Moran. He played recurring characters on the ABC TV 2011-12 series Pan Am, the NBC TV 2013 series Do No Harm, and season 6 of the USA Network series Royal Pains.

== Personal life ==
Davidson is married to actress Mary Stuart Masterson; the couple has four children. They met in 2004 during a production of Cat on a Hot Tin Roof and married two years later. He was previously married to Shari Berkowitz.

== Selected filmography ==
=== Film ===
Year	Title	Role	Notes
2026	Rain Reign	TBA	
2020	Before/During/After	David	
2010	Salt	President's Secret Service Agent	
2007	Tickling Leo	—N/a	Producer, director and writer
2006	Little Chenier	Carl LeBauve	
2005	Hate	Joey	TV movie

=== Television ===
Year	Title	Role	Notes
2018	Seven Seconds	James Connelly	9 episodes
2017	Madam Secretary	Daryl Brennan	2 episodes
2015	Chicago P.D.	Sgt. Dave Roland	1 episode
2014	Gotham	Nikolai	2 episodes
2014	Royal Pains	Ray Mazzarino	6 episodes
2014	Elementary	Gordon Cushing	1 episode
2014	The Americans	Emmett Connors	Episode: "Comrades"
2013	Do No Harm	Rob	5 episodes
2012	Person of Interest	Brad Jennings	Episode: "Many Happy Returns"
2011-2012	Pan Am	Richard Parks	14 episodes Recurring Character
2010	Brothers & Sisters	Jack Randall	4 episodes
2007-2012	Army Wives	Chase Moran	Recurring character (6 seasons)
2007	The Kill Point	Corporal Henry "Mr. Rabbit" Roman	8 episodes
2006	Cold Case	Julius Carver	Episode: "Dog Day Afternoons"
2010	Law & Order: Special Victims Unit	Seth Coleman	Episode: "Penetration"
2000-2001	Roswell	Grant Sorenson	5 episodes
2000	Strangers With Candy	Drake Rogers	Season 2 Episode 1: The Virgin Jerri
1999	Law & Order	Sean Russo	Episode: "Ambitious"
