= Deadly Weapon =

- Directed by: Michael Miner
- Screenplay by: Michael Miner
- Story by: George Lafia; Michael Miner
- Produced by: Peter Manoogian
- Starring: Rodney Eastman; Robert Benedetti; Arell Blanton
- Cinematography: James L. Carter
- Edited by: Peter Teschner; King Wilder
- Music by: Guy Moon
- Production company: Empire International Pictures
- Distributed by: Trans World Entertainment; CBS/Fox Video
- Release date: August 15, 1989
- Running time: 89 minutes
- Country: United States
- Language: English
- Budget: $2 million

Deadly Weapon is a 1989 American science fiction film directed by Michael Miner and starring Rodney Eastman. It was released direct-to-video.

== Plot ==
A teenager named Zeke, who fantasizes that he is from outer space, is bullied by some other teens at school and deals with a drunken father, runaway mother and a sister who delights in being nasty to him. He finds a lost experimental military weapon in a river near his home. The weapon fires anti-matter X-rays. Zeke uses it for self-defense as a means to deal with his persecutors, both at school and at home.

An army team led by the overzealous Lt. Dalton, responsible for originally losing the weapon, is sent to recover the weapon before its unstable reactor overloads and causes a meltdown. The situation degenerates into a siege.

== Cast ==
- Rodney Eastman as Zeke "King Bee"
- Robert Benedetti as Bernard Bauhaus
- Arell Blanton as Edwin
- Susan Blu as Shirley
- Tom Cesano as Joey
- Ed Corbett as Engineer
- Gary Frank as Lieutenant Dalton
- Adam Gifford as Wade (credited as G. Adam Gifford)
- Michael Hennessey as Frampton
- Michael Horse as Joe "Indian Joe"
- Richard Steven Horvitz as Lester (credited as Richard S. Horvitz)
- Sasha Jenson as Martin
- William Sanderson as Reverend Smith
- Kim Walker as Traci
- Gary Kroeger as Glover
- John Lafayette as Sergeant Conroy
- Barney Martin as Mayor Bigelow
- Sam Melville as Sheriff Bartlett

== Production ==
Michael Miner wrote the film as an "anti-weapons" film and wrote the film with specific intent on reaching a younger audience.

RoboCop creator Michael Miner was invited by Charles Band to create a sequel to the 1978 film Laserblast, which was also produced by Band, in August 1986. Miner at this time worked as second unit director on RoboCop set. Although planned as a sequel to Laserblast, while writing the script - and partially due to financial constraints-, Band and Miner decided to make an original film, based on the central idea. Adapted from a story by George Lafia.

Deadly Weapon was filmed from May through June 1987 in and around Southern California. According to Miner, he consulted with a physicist to get their opinion on whether the ray gun in the film looked plausible. Due to the film's low budget Miner made the film more character focused rather than effects focused comparing the final film to a mixture of Badlands by way of WarGames.

== Reception ==
Creature Feature found the movie to be unusually sensitive for a Charles Band production, giving the movie 3.5 out of 5 stars. The review praised the subtle handling of the theme of teen suicide as well its addressing the problems of growing up in a dysfunctional family.

== Awards ==
Rodney Eastman was nominated for a Saturn Award best performance by a young actor.

== Home Release ==
The movie was released on video by Trans World Entertainment on August 15, 1989. While a DVD release occurred in the Netherlands, no plans have been made to release the film onto DVD in the United States.
