= Mary Stuart Masterson =

American actress and director (born 1966)

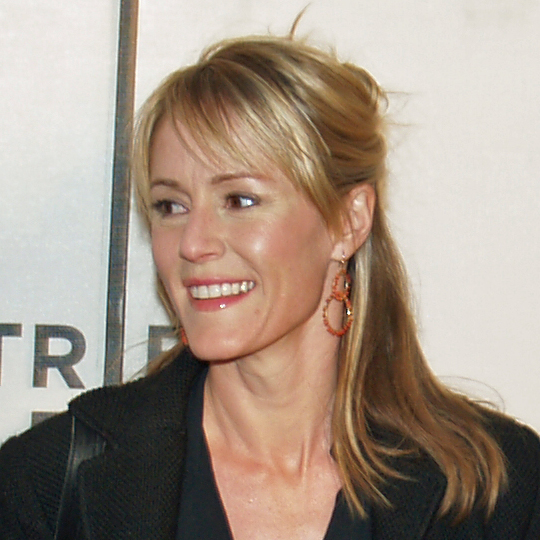
- Masterson in 2007
- Born: June 28, 1966 (age 60); Los Angeles, California, U.S.
- Education: New York University
- Occupations: Actress, director
- Years active: 1974–present
- Spouses: George Carl Francisco (m. 1990; div. 1992) Damon Santostefano (m. 2000; div. 2004) Jeremy Davidson (m. 2006)
- Children: 4
- Parents: Peter Masterson (father); Carlin Glynn (mother)
- Relatives: Horton Foote (first cousin once removed)

Mary Stuart Masterson (born June 28, 1966) is an American actress, producer, and director. After making her acting debut as a child in The Stepford Wives (1975), Masterson took a ten-year hiatus to focus on her education. Her early film roles include Heaven Help Us (1985), At Close Range (1986), Some Kind of Wonderful (1987), and Chances Are (1989). Her performance in the film Immediate Family (1989) won her the National Board of Review Award for Best Supporting Actress, and she earned additional praise for her roles in Fried Green Tomatoes (1991) and Benny & Joon (1993).

Masterson later shifted her focus to television projects, appearing in Kate Brasher (2001) which she also produced, Something the Lord Made (2004), Law & Order: Special Victims Unit (2004–2007), Mercy (2010), NCIS (2017), Blindspot (2017–2019), and For Life (2020). She also performed in the Broadway revival of Nine (2003) for which she was nominated for the Tony Award for Best Featured Actress in a Musical, and directed The Cake Eaters (2007). She returned to mainstream film with As You Are (2017), and has since appeared in Skin (2018), Daniel Isn't Real (2019), and Five Nights at Freddy's (2023).

== Early life ==
Masterson was born June 28, 1966, in Los Angeles, California, to writer-director-actor-producer Peter Masterson and singer-actress Carlin Glynn. She has two siblings: Peter Jr., and Alexandra.

As a teenager, she attended Stagedoor Manor Performing Arts Training Center in the Catskills Mountains New York with actors Robert Downey Jr. and Jon Cryer. Later, she attended schools in New York, including eight months studying anthropology at New York University.

== Career ==
Masterson's first film appearance was in The Stepford Wives (1975) at the age of eight, playing a daughter to her real-life father. Rather than continue her career as a child actor, she chose to continue her studies, although she did appear in several productions at the Dalton School.

In 1985, she returned to cinema in Heaven Help Us as Danni, a courageous teen running the soda shop of her gravely depressed father. She appeared with Sean Penn and Christopher Walken in the film At Close Range (1986) as Brad Jr.'s girlfriend Terry, a film based on an actual rural Pennsylvania crime family led by Bruce Johnston Sr. during the 1960s and 1970s. She later starred as the tomboyish drummer Watts in the teenage drama Some Kind of Wonderful (1987).

That same year, Francis Ford Coppola cast her in Gardens of Stone in which she acted with her parents who were hired by Coppola to play her on-screen parents. In 1989, she played in Chances Are alongside Cybill Shepherd, Ryan O'Neal and Robert Downey Jr., and starred as Lucy Moore, a teenage girl giving up her first baby to a wealthy couple, played by Glenn Close and James Woods in Immediate Family. For her work in the latter, she won the National Board of Review Award for Best Supporting Actress.

Masterson continued acting in films and television during the 1990s. In 1991, she starred in Fried Green Tomatoes, a film based on the novel Fried Green Tomatoes at the Whistle Stop Cafe. The film was well-received, with film critic Roger Ebert applauding Masterson's work. The following year she was invited to host Saturday Night Live. In 1993, she played opposite Johnny Depp in Benny & Joon as Joon, his mentally ill love interest. In May 1993, Masterson revealed she had written a screenplay for a film tentatively entitled Around the Block, a romantic comedy about a "woman who conquers her fears by becoming a singer"; in a cover story about Benny & Joon's box office success, she told Entertainment Weekly she was going to direct it herself, with principal photography expected that autumn.

In 1994, she acted in Bad Girls, playing Anita Crown, a former prostitute, who joins with three other former prostitutes (played by Madeleine Stowe, Andie MacDowell and Drew Barrymore) in traveling the Old West. In 1996, Masterson acted alongside Christian Slater in the romantic drama Bed of Roses.

Although Masterson carried on her work in the film industry, by 2000 she had made a move towards television. In 2001, she began her directing career with a segment titled "The Other Side" in the television movie On the Edge. In 2001, she produced her own television series, Kate Brasher, which was canceled by CBS after six episodes. In 2004, Masterson played Dr. Helen Taussig in the Emmy and Peabody Award-winning HBO biographical drama Something the Lord Made.

Masterson has appeared in Broadway theater productions, and was nominated for the Tony Award for Best Featured Actress in a Musical in the Maury Yeston musical Nine, directed by David Leveaux. Between 2004 and 2007, she made five guest starring appearances on Law & Order: Special Victims Unit as Dr. Rebecca Hendrix. A decade later, she appeared in a recurring role as FBI director Eleanor Hirst in the second and third seasons of Blindspot. In 2020, she appeared in a starring role in the first season of the legal drama For Life. In 2023, she appeared in Five Nights at Freddy's.

Masterson has narrated several audiobooks, including I See You Everywhere by Julia Glass, Book of the Dead by Patricia Cornwell, The Quickie by James Patterson and Look Again by Lisa Scottoline.

Masterson made her feature film directorial debut in 2007, with The Cake Eaters, which premiered at the Ft. Lauderdale International Film Festival as well as the Ashland Independent Film Festival where it received the 'Audience Award – Dramatic Feature' prize in 2008. Of her move to directing, Masterson said in an interview, "When I signed to do this, I wasn't scared but, yes, it was scary. I'm already 40, although we don't want to talk about that. In '92, I wrote my first screenplay, which I then was to direct, but I ended up taking an acting job because it takes forever to get a movie made."

== Personal life ==
Masterson was married to George Carl Francisco from 1990 to 1992 and to filmmaker Damon Santostefano from 2000 to 2004. In 2006, Masterson married actor Jeremy Davidson after they starred together in the 2004 stage production of Cat on a Hot Tin Roof. In October 2009, Masterson gave birth to their first child, son Phineas Bee. She gave birth to twins in August 2011, son Wilder and daughter Clio, and she had a fourth child in October 2013.

== Filmography ==
=== Film ===
Year	Title	Role	Notes
1975	The Stepford Wives	Kim Eberhart	
1985	Heaven Help Us	Danni	
1986	At Close Range	Terry	
1987	Some Kind of Wonderful	Watts	
1987	Gardens of Stone	Rachel Feld	
1987	My Little Girl	Franny Bettinger	
1988	Mr. North	Elspeth Skeel	
1989	Chances Are	Miranda Jeffries	
1989	Immediate Family	Lucy Moore	
1990	Funny About Love	Daphne Delillo	
1991	Fried Green Tomatoes	Imogene "Idgie" Threadgoode	
1992	Mad at the Moon	Jenny Hill	
1993	Married to It	Nina Bishop	
1993	Benny & Joon	Juniper "Joon" Pearl	
1994	Bad Girls	Anita Crown	
1994	Radioland Murders	Penny Henderson	
1996	Bed of Roses	Lisa Walker	
1996	Heaven's Prisoners	Robin Gaddis	
1997	Dogtown	Dorothy Sternen	
1997	Digging to China	Gwen Frankovitz	
1997	The Postman	Hope, Postman's Daughter	Uncredited cameo
1999	The Book of Stars	Penny McGuire	
1999	The Florentine	Vikki	
2002	West of Here	Genevieve Anderson	
2002	Leo	Brynne	
2005	The Sisters	Olga Prior	
2005	Whiskey School	G.G.	
2006	The Insurgents	Director	
2017	As You Are	Karen	
2018	Skin	Agent Jackie Marks	
2019	Daniel Isn't Real	Claire Nightingale	
2023	Five Nights at Freddy's	Aunt Jane	
2023	The Senior	Eileen	
2026	Rain Reign	TBA	
TBA	Sunny	TBA	Post-production

=== As director ===
Year	Title	Notes
2001	On the Edge	Television film Segment: "The Other Side"
2007	The Cake Eaters	Feature film

=== Television ===
Year	Title	Role	Notes
1980	City in Fear	Abby Crawford	ABC television film
1985	Love Lives On	Susan Wallace	ABC television film
1986	Amazing Stories	Cynthia Simpson	Segment: "Go to the Head of the Class (Book Two)"
1992	Saturday Night Live	Herself / Host	Episode: "Mary Stuart Masterson/En Vogue"
1996	Lily Dale	Lily Dale	Showtime television film
1997	On the 2nd Day of Christmas	Patricia "Trish" Tracy	Lifetime Television television film
1999	Black and Blue	Frances Benedetto	CBS television film
2001	Kate Brasher	Kate Brasher	Main role; also producer
2001	Three Blind Mice	Patricia Demming	CBS television film
2002	R.U.S./H.	Elaine Burba	Unsold CBS pilot
2003	Gary the Rat	Caroline Swanson	Voice role Episode: "Old Flame"
2004	Blue's Clues	Cinderella	Episode: "Love Day"
2004	Something the Lord Made	Dr. Helen Taussig	HBO television film
2004–2007	Law & Order: Special Victims Unit	Dr. Rebecca Hendrix	Recurring role; 5 episodes
2006	Waterfront	Heather Centrella	Recurring role; 5 episodes
2009	Cupid	Mira	Episode: "Live and Let Spy"
2010	Mercy	Dr. Denise Cabe	Recurring role; 4 episodes
2012	Touch	Beth Cooper	Episode: "The Road Not Taken"
2013	The Good Wife	Rachel Keyser	Episode: "Whack-a-Mole"
2015	Blue Bloods	Catherine Tucker	Episode: "Absolute Power"
2017	NCIS	Congresswoman Jenna Flemming	Recurring role; 3 episodes
2017–2019	Blindspot	FBI Director Eleanor Hirst	Recurring role; 11 episodes
2020	For Life	Anya Harrison	Main role

=== Stage ===
Year	Title	Role	Notes
1982	Alice in Wonderland	Four of Hearts/Small White Rabbit	Virgina Theatre, Broadway
2003	Nine	Luisa	Eugene O'Neill Theatre, Broadway
2004	Cat on a Hot Tin Roof	Maggie	The Kennedy Center

== Awards and nominations ==
Year	Award	Category	Nominated work	Result
1989	National Board of Review Awards	Best Supporting Actress	Immediate Family	Won
1994	MTV Movie & TV Awards	Best On-Screen Duo (Note: Shared with Johnny Depp)	Benny & Joon	Nominated
1997	Lonestar Film & Television Awards	Best TV Actress	Lily Dale	Nominated
2001	DVD Exclusive Awards	Best Actress	The Book of Stars	Nominated
2003	Tony Awards	Best Featured Actress in a Musical	Nine	Nominated
2005	Satellite Awards	Best Supporting Actress in a Series, Miniseries or Television Film	Something the Lord Made	Nominated
2007	Fort Lauderdale International Film Festival	Best American Indie	The Cake Eaters	Won
2008	Ashland Independent Film Festival	Best Dramatic Feature	The Cake Eaters	Won
