= Earthworm Jim (disambiguation) =

Earthworm Jim is a video game franchise based on the adventures of an anthropomorphic earthworm.

Earthworm Jim may also refer to:

- video games in the series:
  - Earthworm Jim
  - Earthworm Jim 2
  - Earthworm Jim 3D
  - Earthworm Jim: Menace 2 the Galaxy
  - Earthworm Jim 4
  - Earthworm Jim HD
  - Earthworm Jim, an entry in the series that was planned for PSP
- Earthworm Jim, television series based on the video game series
