= Shotgun (disambiguation) =

A shotgun is a type of firearm.

- Sawed-off shotgun/Boomstick

Shotgun may also refer to:

== Science and technology ==
- Shotgun hill climbing, a type of mathematical optimization algorithm in computer science
- Shotgun house, a type of narrow, rectangular house
- Shotgun sequencing, a method of sequencing DNA
- Shotgunning (cold reading), a "mind-reading" technique
- Shotgun mic, a type of microphone with a long barrel
- Shotgun debugging or shotgunning, a technique in system troubleshooting, debugging, or repair
- Shotgun Software, a project management software for creative studios owned by Autodesk

== Slang ==
- Riding shotgun, a passenger sitting beside the driver in a car or other vehicle
- Shotgun wedding, a hasty wedding due to unplanned pregnancy
- Shotgunning, a method for rapidly drinking beer out of a can by punching a hole in it
- to shotgun weed or a joint, when one person forces marijuana smoke into the mouth of another person

== Sport ==
- Shotgun (shooting sports), a shooting sports discipline
- Shotgun, nickname ("Escopeta" in Spanish) of Sergio Roitman (born 1979), professional tennis player from Argentina
- Shotgun formation, an offensive formation in American football
- "The Shotgun", a nickname for snooker player Jamie Cope
- WWF Shotgun Saturday Night, a television series

== Film and television ==
- Shotgun (1955 film), an American Western film
- Shotgun, 1989 film with Rif Hutton
- Shotgun, retitled After Everything, a 2018 American comedy-drama film
- "Shotgun" (Breaking Bad), a 2011 television episode
- "Shotgun" (Juliet Bravo), a 1980 television episode
- Shotgun (Law & Order), 2009 episode of Law & Order

== Literature ==
- "Shotgun" (comics), a fictional villain in Marvel Comics works
- Shotgun (novel), a novel by Ed McBain
- Shotgun News (Firearms News since 2016), an American shooting and firearms interest publication

== Music ==
- Shotgun (funk band), American funk band from Detroit, Michigan
- Shotgun (rock band), 1970s American rock band from Dallas, Texas
- Shotgun (Jamie J. Morgan album), 1990
- Shotgun, a 2004 album by Tony Lucca

=== Songs ===
- "Shotgun" (Christina Aguilera song), 2015
- "Shotgun" (George Ezra song), 2018
- "Shotgun" (Junior Walker & the All Stars song), 1965
- "Shotgun" (Limp Bizkit song), 2011
- "Shotgun" (Psychic Fever song), 2024
- "Shotgun" (Sheryl Crow song), 2014
- "Shotgun" (Yellow Claw song), 2013
- "Shotgun", a song by the Dave Matthews Band
- "Shotgun", a song by Selena
- "Shotgun", a song by Soccer Mommy from Sometimes, Forever
- "Shotgun", a song by Reks from REBELutionary
- "Shotgun", an instrumental by W&W, 2012
- "Shotgun" a song by Big Black from Racer-X, 1984

== See also ==
- Shogun, a Japanese title
- Shotgun wedding (disambiguation)
