= 1953 in television =

The year 1953 in television involved some significant events. Below is a list of television-related events during 1953.

== Events ==
- January 19 – 68% of all U.S. television sets are tuned in to I Love Lucy to watch Lucy give birth to little Ricky.
- January 23 – TP1, a predecessor of TVP1, a member of Telewizja Polska, becomes the first television station in Poland when it officially begins a regular broadcasting service, from Warsaw.
- February 1
  - Japanese television begins when JOAK-TV begins broadcasting from Tokyo.
  - General Electric Theater airs for the first time on CBS.
- February 18 – Lucille Ball and Desi Arnaz sign an $8,000,000 contract to continue the I Love Lucy television series through 1955.
- February 26 – Fulton J. Sheen, on his program Life Is Worth Living, reads Shakespeare's Julius Caesar, with the names of high-ranking Soviet officials replacing the main characters. At the end of the reading, Sheen intones that "Stalin must one day meet his judgment". Stalin dies one week later.
- March 17 – Patrick Troughton becomes television's first Robin Hood, playing the eponymous folk hero in the first of six half-hour episodes of Robin Hood, shown weekly until April 21 on the BBC Television Service.
- March 19 – The 25th Academy Awards is broadcast by NBC in the U.S. This becomes the first Academy Awards ceremony to be televised.
- March 25 – CBS concedes victory to RCA in the war over color television standards.
- April 3 – TV Guide is published for the first time in the United States, with 10 editions and a circulation of 1,562,000.
- May 1 – Czechoslovak Television becomes the first television station in the country when it officially begins a regular broadcasting service, from Prague; this station will separate into Czech Television and Slovenská televízia in January 1993.
- May 25 – KUHT in Houston becomes the first non-commercial educational TV station in the United States.
- June 2 – The Coronation of Queen Elizabeth II is televised by the BBC from London. Sales of TV sets in the United Kingdom rise sharply in the weeks leading up to the event. It is also one of the earliest broadcasts to be deliberately recorded for posterity and still exists in its entirety. More than twenty million viewers around the world watch the coverage; to ensure Canadians could see it on the same day, British Royal Air Force Canberras fly film of the ceremony across the Atlantic Ocean to be broadcast by the Canadian Broadcasting Corporation, the first non-stop flight between the United Kingdom and the Canadian mainland. In Goose Bay, Labrador, the film is transferred to a Royal Canadian Air Force CF-100 jet fighter for the further trip to Montreal. In all, three such voyages are made as the coronation proceeds.
- July 18
  - The Quatermass Experiment, first of the famous Quatermass science-fiction serials by Nigel Kneale, begins its run on the BBC in the U.K.
  - The Tonight Show begins as a local New York variety show, originally titled The Knickerbocker Beer Show.
- August 28 – Nippon Television, becomes the first regular broadcast service to start in Tokyo, Japan. The first program is Hato no kyujitsu.
- August 30 – NBC's Kukla, Fran, and Ollie is the first publicly announced experimental broadcast of a program in RCA compatible color.
- September 27 – TV Record, a major free-to-air television network in Brazil, becomes the first official regular broadcasting service to start in São Paulo.
- October 18 – A live television adaptation of the Shakespeare play King Lear starring Orson Welles is aired on CBS as part of the Omnibus series.
- October 19 – American CBS presenter Arthur Godfrey dismisses singer Julius La Rosa live on air on the radio-only segment of his morning show.
- October 23 – Alto Broadcasting System of the Philippines makes the first television broadcast in the Philippines through DZAQ-TV. Alto Broadcasting System is the predecessor of what is now ABS-CBN Corporation.
- November 15 – Radio Caracas Television (RCTV) becomes the first television station in Venezuela when it officially begins a regular broadcast service.
- November 22 – RCA airs (with special permission from the Federal Communications Commission (FCC) in the U.S.) the first commercial color program in compatible color, The Colgate Comedy Hour with Donald O'Connor.
- November 26 – NBC broadcasts its first national telecast of the Macy's Thanksgiving Day Parade.
- December 2 – BBC broadcasts its 'Television Symbol' for the first time, the first animated television presentation symbol.
- December 12 – The DuMont Television Network televises its first ever National Basketball Association game with the Boston Celtics defeating the Baltimore Bullets 106–75. This marked the first year the NBA had a national television contract. This was the only year of NBA coverage on DuMont; the Saturday afternoon package moved to NBC for the 1954–55 season, mainly because NBC could clear the games on far more stations that DuMont could.
- December 17 – The FCC reverses its 1951 decision and approves the RCA/NTSC color system.
- December 24 – Dragnet becomes the first filmed drama to be televised in color each year as a network television program. However, only this one episode, entitled "The Big Little Jesus", is filmed in color during the 1950s; the show returns in the late 1960s in color.

== Programs/programmes ==
=== Series on the air in 1953 ===
- Adventures of Superman (1952–1958)
- American Bandstand (1952–1989)
- Author Meets the Critics (1947–1954)
- Bozo the Clown (1949–)
- Candid Camera (1948–)
- Cisco Kid (1950–1956)
- Come Dancing (UK) (1949–1995)
- Death Valley Days (1952–1975)
- Dragnet (1951–1959)
- Gillette Cavalcade of Sports (1946–1960)
- Hallmark Hall of Fame (1951–)
- Hawkins Falls (1950, 1951–1955)
- Hockey Night in Canada (1952–)
- Howdy Doody (1947–1960)
- I Love Lucy (1951–1960)
- Juvenile Jury (1947–1954)
- Kraft Television Theatre (1947–1958)
- Kukla, Fran and Ollie (1947–1957)
- Life is Worth Living (1952–1957)
- Life with Elizabeth (1952–1955)
- Love of Life (1951–1980)
- Martin Kane, Private Eye (1949–1954)
- Meet the Press (1947–)
- Muffin the Mule (1946–1955)
- My Little Margie (1952–1955)
- Omnibus (1952–1961)
- Our Miss Brooks (1952-1956)
- Search for Tomorrow (1951–1986)
- Television Newsreel (UK) (1948–1954)
- The Adventures of Ozzie and Harriet (1952–1966)
- The Ed Sullivan Show (1948–1971)
- The George Burns and Gracie Allen Show (1950–1958)
- The Goldbergs (1949–1955)
- The Guiding Light (1952–)
- The Jack Benny Show (1950–1965)
- The Roy Rogers Show (1951–1957)
- The Texaco Star Theater (1948–1953); the show was renamed Buick-Berle Show this year (1953–1954)
- The Today Show (1952–)
- The Voice of Firestone (1949–1963)
- This Is Your Life (U.S.; 1952–1961)
- Truth or Consequences (1950–1988)
- What's My Line (1950–1967)
- Your Hit Parade (1950–1959)
- Your Show of Shows (1950–1954)

=== Debuts ===
- February 10 – Romper Room (1953–1994)
- June 8 - Ladies' Choice on NBC (1953)
- June 20 – Bank on the Stars on CBS (1953), then NBC (1954)
- July 11 - Medallion Theatre on CBS (1953-1954)
- July 6 - Glamour Girl on NBC (1953-1954)
- July 14 -Anyone Can Win on CBS (1953)
- July 20 – The Good Old Days on BBC Television (1953–1983)
- August 18 - Judge for Yourself with Fred Allen on NBC (1953–1954)
- September 13 – Jukebox Jury on ABC (1953–1954)
- September 13 - The George Jessel Show on ABC.
- September 29 – Make Room For Daddy with Danny Thomas on ABC (1953-1957), then moved to CBS (1957–1964)
- October 2 – The Pepsi-Cola Playhouse, an anthology series, The Comeback Story, a reality show, and The Pride of the Family, a situation comedy, all on ABC
- October 5 – Of Many Things, panel discussion show with Dr. Bergen Evans on ABC (1953–1954)
- October 8 – Where's Raymond?, starring Ray Bolger on ABC (in season 2, it is known as The Ray Bolger Show) (1954–1955)
- October 11 - The Man Behind the Badge on CBS (1953-1954)
- November 4 - Take It from Me on ABC (1953-1954)
- November 11
  - The current affairs series Panorama on BBC Television; now the longest-running programme on British television
  - The public affairs series Answers for Americans on ABC
- December 1 – CBC Theatre on the Canadian Broadcasting Corporation [later known as General Motors Theatre (1954–1956) and General Motors Presents (1958–1961)]
- Place the Face, with principal host Bill Cullen, on CBS (1953–1954); then transferred to NBC (1954–1955)

=== Ending this year ===
Date	Show	Debut
March 26	Biff Baker, U.S.A.	1952
April	The Amos 'n Andy Show	1951
April	The Ernie Kovacs Show	1952
May 3	Victory at Sea	1952
June 26	Kaleidoscope (UK)	1946
September 30	A Date with Judy (prime time version)	1952
November 13	Front Page Detective	1951
December 26	Bonino	1953
Unknown	Café Continental (UK)	1947
Unknown	Leave It to Larry	1952

== Births ==
Date	Name	Notability
January 5	Pamela Sue Martin	Actress (The Hardy Boys/Nancy Drew Mysteries, Dynasty)
January 8	Damián Alcázar	Actor
January 8	Tonita Castro	Actress (died 2016)
January 10	Pat Benatar	Singer
January 20	Colleen Zenk	Actress (As the World Turns)
January 29	Paul Fusco	Puppeteer (ALF)
January 29	Lynne McGranger	Australian actress (Home and Away)
February 8	Mary Steenburgen	Actress (The Last Man on Earth)
February 11	Philip Anglim	Actor
February 12	Joanna Kerns	Actress (Growing Pains)
February 14	Martha Raddatz	Reporter
February 15	Lynn Whitfield	Actress (Without a Trace)
February 17	Becky Ann Baker	Actress
February 19	Bill Kirchenbauer	Actor (Just the Ten of Us)
February 21	William Petersen	Actor (CSI: Crime Scene Investigation)
February 21	Christine Ebersole	Actress (Steven Universe, The Cavanaughs, Royal Pains)
February 21	Peter Van Sant	American television news reporter
March 4	Kay Lenz	Actress (Reasonable Doubts)
March 6	Jacklyn Zeman	Actress (General Hospital) (died 2023)
March 6	Armen Keteyian	Armenian American television journalist
March 9	Lauren Koslow	Actress (Days of Our Lives)
March 10	Paul Haggis	Director
March 12	Ron Jeremy	Pornographic actor
March 16	Micheline Charest	Producer (died 2004)
March 24	Louie Anderson	Actor (died 2022)
March 25	Mary Gross	Actress (Saturday Night Live)
April 13	Grant Geissman	American composer
April 16	Jay O. Sanders	Actor
April 18	Rick Moranis	Canadian actor and comedian
April 19	Ruby Wax	American-born comedic actress, presenter (The Full Wax)
April 22	Gary Adelson	Producer
April 23	James Russo	Actor
April 24	Eric Bogosian	Actor (Law & Order: Criminal Intent)
May 1	David Gulpilil	Actor (died 2021)
May 3	Jake Hooker	Musician (died 2014)
May 6	Tony Blair	Politician
May 9	Amy Hill	Actress
May 16	Pierce Brosnan	Irish-born actor (Remington Steele, The Son)
May 16	Peter Onorati	Actor
May 17	Kathleen Sullivan	Journalist
May 20	Michael Dinner	Screenwriter
May 29	Danny Elfman	Singer and composer (Batman: The Animated Series, The Simpsons, Pee-wee's Playhouse)
May 30	Colm Meaney	Actor (Star Trek: Deep Space Nine)
June 1	Diana Canova	Actress
June 10	John Edwards	Politician
June 11	Peter Bergman	Actor (All My Children, The Young and the Restless)
June 13	Tim Allen	Actor (Home Improvement, Last Man Standing)
June 16	Valerie Mahaffey	Actress and producer (Northern Exposure)
June 21	Michael Bowen	Actor (Lost, Breaking Bad)
June 22	Cyndi Lauper	Singer and actress
June 26	Robert Davi	Actor (Profiler)
July 4	Jon Plowman	Producer
July 10	Marco Rodríguez	Actor
July 11	Mindy Sterling	Actress
July 11	Patricia Reyes Spíndola	Actress
July 13	Gil Birmingham	Actor
July 23	Lydia Cornell	Actress (Too Close for Comfort)
July 29	Tim Gunn	Actor
August 1	Howard Kurtz	American journalist
August 2	Butch Patrick	Actor (The Munsters)
August 4	Tony Barnhart	Reporter
August 8	Donny Most	Actor (Happy Days)
August 9	Kathleen Matthews	Reporter
August 11	Hulk Hogan	Wrestler (Hogan Knows Best) (died 2025)
August 13	Jim Paratore	Producer (died 2012)
August 14	James Horner	Composer (died 2015)
August 16	Kathie Lee Gifford	Singer and talk show co-host (Live! with Regis and Kathie Lee)
August 16	Vincent Curatola	Actor
August 20	Peter Horton	Actor (thirtysomething)
August 20	Ron Claiborne	American journalist
August 26	Emiliano Díez	Cuban actor (George Lopez)
August 27	Peter Stormare	Swedish actor (Prison Break)
August 30	Robert Parish	NBA basketball player
August 31	Marcia Clark	Lawyer, correspondent, and producer
September 1	Jonathan LaPook	American physician
September 2	Keith Allen	Welsh actor
September 4	Lawrence Hilton-Jacobs	Actor (Welcome Back, Kotter)
September 6	Katherine Cannon	Actress (Beverly Hills, 90210)
September 7	Kristin Griffith	Actress
September 10	Amy Irving	Actress
September 13	Iyanla Vanzant	TV personality (Iyanla: Fix My Life)
September 14	Robert Wisdom	Actor (The Wire, Prison Break)
September 14	Kurt Fuller	Actor
September 16	Lenny Clarke	Comedian and actor (Rescue Me)
September 16	Christopher Rich	Actor (Murphy Brown, Reba)
September 27	Robbie Shakespeare	Producer (died 2021)
September 29	Drake Hogestyn	Actor (Days of Our Lives)
October 6	Wendy Robie	Actress (Twin Peaks)
October 7	Christopher Norris	Actress (Trapper John, M.D.)
October 9	Tony Shalhoub	Actor (Adrian Monk on Monk)
October 11	David Morse	Actor (St. Elsewhere)
October 12	Les Dennis	English television presenter
October 14	Greg Evigan	Actor (My Two Dads)
October 14	Howard Schultz	Producer
October 15	Larry Miller	Comedian
October 20	Keith Hernandez	Sports broadcaster
October 26	Lauren Tewes	Actress (The Love Boat)
October 27	Robert Picardo	Actor (China Beach, Star Trek: Voyager)
October 28	Desmond Child	Songwriter
October 30	Charles Lewis	Journalist
October 31	Michael J. Anderson	Actor (Twin Peaks)
October 31	Lynda Goodfriend	Actress (Happy Days)
November 3	Dennis Miller	Talk show host, commentator, comedian (Saturday Night Live)
November 3	Kate Capshaw	Actress
November 5	Joyce Maynard	American journalist
November 12	Carl Ciarfalio	American actor
November 15	James Widdoes	American actor
November 18	Kevin Nealon	Actor and comedian (Saturday Night Live, Weeds, Glenn Martin, DDS)
November 18	Kath Soucie	Actress (Tiny Toon Adventures, Captain Planet and the Planeteers, Rugrats, Earthworm Jim, Dexter's Laboratory, Hey Arnold!, Futurama)
November 19	Robert Beltran	Actor (Commander Chakotay on Star Trek: Voyager)
November 19	Tom Villard	Actor (died 1994)
November 26	Jacki MacDonald	Australian television personality
November 27	Curtis Armstrong	Actor (Dan Vs., Robot and Monster, The Emperor's New School)
November 28	Pamela Hayden	Actress
December 1	Antoine de Caunes	French Anglophone presenter (Eurotrash)
December 6	Kin Shriner	Actor (General Hospital, Justice League Unlimited)
December 7	Susie Coelho	TV personality
December 8	Sam Kinison	Comedian and actor (Charlie Hoover) (died 1992)
December 8	Kim Basinger	Actress
December 9	John Malkovich	Actor
December 11	Bess Armstrong	Actress
December 14	Gail Matthius	Actress (Saturday Night Live)
December 17	Barry Livingston	Actor (My Three Sons)
December 17	Bill Pullman	Actor
December 22	Bern Nadette Stanis	Actress (Good Times)
December 22	Jay Brazeau	Actor
December 23	John Callahan	Actor (died 2020)
December 29	Charlayne Woodard	Actress
December 30	Meredith Vieira	Journalist, talk show host, game show host (Who Wants to Be a Millionaire)
December 31	James Remar	Actor (The Huntress)

== Television debuts ==
- Anouk Aimée – Douglas Fairbanks Presents
- Claude Akins – You Are There
- John Drew Barrymore – Schlitz Playhouse of Stars
- James Best – Fireside Theatre
- Walter Brennan – Schlitz Playhouse of Stars
- Carol Channing – Omnibus
- James Coburn – Four Star Playhouse
- Chuck Connors – Your Jeweler's Showcase
- Robert Cornthwaite – Cavalcade of America
- Joan Crawford – The Revlon Mirror Theater
- Charles Durning – You Are There
- Mel Ferrer – Omnibus
- Janet Gaynor – Medallion Theatre
- Clifton James – Rocky King Detective
- Eartha Kitt – You Are There
- Martin Landau – The Goldbergs
- Ida Lupino – Four Star Playhouse
- Barton MacLane – Your Jeweler's Showcase
- Ray Milland – Meet Mr. McNutley
- Jeanne Moreau – La joie de vivre
- Leonard Nimoy – Four Star Playhouse
- Anthony Perkins – The Big Story
- Christopher Plummer – Studio One
- Eleanor Powell – The Faith of Our Children
- George Raft – I'm the Law
- Marion Ross – Cavalcade of America
- William Shatner – Space Command
- Harry Shearer – Omnibus
- Michael Trubshawe – The Passing Show
- Robert Wagner – Juke Box Jury
