= Ladies' Choice =

Ladies' Choice may refer to:

== Film and television ==
- Ladies' Choice (film), a 1980 Bulgarian film
- "Ladies' Choice" (Roseanne), a television episode
- Ladies' Choice (TV series), a 1953 American TV program

== Music ==
=== Albums ===
- Ladies Choice (Bill Anderson album), 1979
- Ladies' Choice (George Jones album), 1984
- Ladies Choice, by Latimore, 2011
- Ladies' Choice or the title song, by Michael Stanley Band, 1976
- Ladies' Choice, by Paul Taylor, 2007
- Ladies Choice, by Shotgun, 1982

=== Songs ===
- "Ladies' Choice" (Hairspray song), performed by Zac Efron in the film Hairspray, 2007
- "Ladies Choice", by Underground Lovers from Leaves Me Blind, 1992

== See also ==
- Damenwahl (lit. Ladies' choice), an album by Die Toten Hosen
- Lady's Choice, a condiment brand
- Lady's Choice (film), a 1953 West German film
- Lady's Choice, an album by Bonnie Bramlett, 1976
