= Earthworm Jim (cancelled video game) =

- Developer: Shiny Entertainment
- Publisher: Atari
- Designers: David Perry; Doug TenNapel
- Series: Earthworm Jim
- Platform: PlayStation Portable
- Release: Cancelled
- Genre: Platform shoot 'em up
- Modes: Single-player, multiplayer

Earthworm Jim, also known as Earthworm Jim PSP, was a planned entry in the Earthworm Jim series of video games, intended for release on the PlayStation Portable. Initially thought to be a remake of the original Earthworm Jim, it was later revealed that it would contain mostly original content. The game was reported to reunite some of the developers who had worked on the acclaimed Earthworm Jim and Earthworm Jim 2 but been absent during production of the more poorly received Earthworm Jim 3D and Earthworm Jim: Menace 2 the Galaxy. Although said to be 80% complete in August 2006 and slated for an early 2007 release date, the game was ultimately cancelled in mid-2007.

== Development ==
Rumors of an Earthworm Jim game started in 2006. It was originally believed to be a remake of the original Earthworm Jim due to footage of Jim in a level very reminiscent of the "New Junk City" level from the first game. The game was formally announced at E3 2006 by Atari, who had obtained the rights to the franchise. However, the game was reported to still be made by members of the original two titles, Earthworm Jim and Earthworm Jim 2, including Shiny Entertainment founder Dave Perry, Doug TenNapel, Nick Bruty, and Tommy Tallarico. The developers later announced that the game would be mostly new content, with elements of the earlier games included. Past characters to return in the game included Princess What's-Her-Name and Peter Puppy.

By August 2006, the game was reportedly at 80% complete, and many video game journalists had hands-on playable builds of the game, such as GameSpot, GamesRadar, and IGN. It was scheduled for an early 2007 release.

== Gameplay ==
The game was to retain the gameplay of the original two titles, playing as a 2D sidescrolling platformer with elements of a run and gun, but now with 3D computer graphics. It would be two-dimensional gameplay with three-dimensional graphics, much in the vein of Sonic Rivals or Klonoa: Door to Phantomile. Similar to the original two games, the gameplay consisted of maneuvering Jim through levels through running and jumping, and defeating enemies with a machine gun, and by using his head as a whip.

Many new features were planned as well. One was the ability to collect different parts for Jim's powersuit, such as new gloves, boots, and armor. Some parts were used to make specific aspects of levels easier, such as the speed boost from the boot upgrade that made traversing a conveyor belt section of a level easier. A two-player, competitive mode was to be included as well. The player also possessed the option to, at any point in the game, make Jim start dancing. For instance, the player can make Jim "do the worm", and make him crouch and fit into smaller spaces.

The game was reported to have eight separate levels, although only two, "New Junk City" and the level referred to as "The Birds and the Bees", were specifically detailed. "New Junk City" was to be a remake of the level of the same name from the original Earthworm Jim, where as "The Birds and the Bees" was a completely new level to be about Jim being trapped in a literal war between birds and bees. GameSpot described the level as "Jim is caught in the middle of a war between the birds and the bees and will have to progress through an increasingly complex level that's design is inspired by the old mousetrap board games. In other words, something Jim does that affects something in one part of a level will fan out and be felt by the complex machinery somewhere else in the level."

== Cancellation ==
Atari had quietly put the game "on hold" by June 2007, with Atari representative Alissa Bell stating "I believe EWJ is off the roster. It may be revisited in the future, but the title is, as I hear it, on hold". The lack of subsequent announcements regarding the game, and Atari’s financial difficulties, led to the general belief that it had been cancelled. In late 2007, Atari announced it had sold off its internal development studios, including Shiny Entertainment, which it owned at the time, and ceased all of its ongoing game development projects as of the end of 2007.
