= Earthworm Jim (video game) =

1994 video game

- Key art for Earthworm Jim
- Developer: Shiny Entertainment (Note: Game Boy, Game Gear, and Master System versions developed by Eurocom; MS-DOS version developed by Rainbow Arts; Windows version developed by Kinesoft; Game Boy Advance version developed by Game Titan.)
- Publishers: Playmates Interactive Entertainment: EU: Virgin Interactive Entertainment; Sega CD Interplay Productions Windows Activision
- Producer: David Luehmann
- Designers: Doug TenNapel; Tom Tanaka
- Programmers: David Perry; Nicholas Jones; Andy Astor
- Artists: Doug TenNapel; Nick Bruty; Steve Crow; Mike Dietz; Ed Schofield
- Composers: Tommy Tallarico; Mark Miller
- Series: Earthworm Jim
- Platforms: Genesis/Mega Drive, Super NES, Sega CD, Game Boy, Game Gear, Windows, MS-DOS, Master System, Game Boy Advance
- Release: October 1994: Genesis/Mega Drive; NA: October 1994; EU: November 1994 Super NES; NA: October 1994; EU: December 16, 1994 Sega CD (Special Edition); NA: May 1995; EU: 1995 (Note: Reported release date varies; sources suggest either May 1995 or June 1995.) Game Boy; NA: 1995 (Note: Reported release date varies; sources suggest either June 1995 or September 1995.); EU: 1995 Game Gear; NA: July 1995; EU: 1995 Windows (Special Edition); NA: November 30, 1995; EU: 1995 MS-DOS; NA: April 30, 1996; EU: 1996 Master System; BR: 1996 Game Boy Advance; NA: June 11, 2001; EU: September 21, 2001
- Genre: Run and gun
- Mode: Single-player

Earthworm Jim is a 1994 run and gun video game developed by Shiny Entertainment and published by Playmates Interactive Entertainment. The game was released for the Sega Genesis and Super Nintendo Entertainment System, before being subsequently ported to several other video game consoles.

It had a positive reception from critics and received a sequel, Earthworm Jim 2, in 1995. In 2009, Gameloft developed and released a remake for mobile phones and Nintendo DSi which was later ported to PlayStation 3 and Xbox 360 as Earthworm Jim HD. In February 2018, Gameloft's contract with Interplay ended and all of the ports developed by Gameloft were removed from digital stores.

== Gameplay ==
Jim in the "New Junk City" level on the Super NES version

The game plays as a 2D sidescrolling platformer with elements of a run and gun game as well. The player controls Jim and must maneuver him through the level while avoiding obstacles and enemies. The player can use Jim's gun as a method of shooting enemies, or his worm body as a whip for whipping enemies. The whip move also allows the player to grab hold of, and swing from, certain hooks. Some levels have additional requirements beyond merely getting to the end of the level. For example, the level "For Pete's Sake" involves making sure the computer-controlled Peter Puppy character gets through the level unscathed, which is accomplished by whipping him to make him jump over pits, and defeating enemies before they can harm him. Failure to do so results in Peter lashing out at Jim, depleting his health.

Levels commonly culminate with a boss battle. The game incorporates a large variety of villains in the boss battles, including Hickboy, Psy-Crow, Queen Slug-for-a-Butt, Evil the Cat, Bob the Killer Goldfish, Major Mucus, and Professor Monkey-for-a-Head-exclusive Robotic Chicken. Two villains made their only appearance in this game: Chuck, a junkyard man with a tendency to vomit bizarre objects; and Doc Duodenum, a crazed organ of a giant alien.

In between most levels, a racing level called "Andy Asteroids" is played. Unlike the rest of the game, it places the viewpoint behind Jim. The player must direct Jim on his rocket, in a race against Psy-Crow, through a tube-like structure while collecting items and boosts and avoiding asteroids. If the player wins, the next level is started instantly. If Psy-Crow wins, a boss fight against him must be won to progress to the next level.

Other variations in gameplay occur throughout the game as well, such as a competitive bungee-jumping and fighting level, and an underwater maze that must be traversed both within a time limit and without crashing too many times.

== Plot ==
Jim is a normal earthworm, until a special "super suit" falls from the sky and allows him to operate much like a human, with his worm body acting as a head and the suit acting as a body. Jim now must evade the game's many antagonists, who want the suit back. The game plays out with Jim succeeding in his quest to meet Princess What's-Her-Name. However, she is crushed by a cow that Jim launched into space at the beginning of the game.

== Development ==
Playmates Toys, finding success with the license for Teenage Mutant Ninja Turtles, wanted to start their own franchise. Inspired by the success of the Sonic the Hedgehog series with its first and second installments, they decided that they wanted to start the franchise as a video game, a rare approach at the time. From there, the game's design actually started with Douglas TenNapel's simple sketch of an earthworm that he presented to Shiny Entertainment. Programmer David Perry and the rest of Shiny bought the rights to Earthworm Jim from TenNapel and started developing the game. From there, TenNapel would work on doing the game design, making level ideas, and voicing Jim's character, while Perry and the other programmers created additional characters and game mechanics. Perry recounted that the giant hamster "was drawn by one of our guys at three o'clock one morning".

The game was developed simultaneously for the Genesis and Super NES using a "custom heterogeneous programming language" created by Shiny Entertainment. Almost all levels were first programmed by Dave Perry on the Genesis and then converted to the Super NES by Nick Jones. "For Pete's Sake" was coded simultaneously on both platforms by Andy Astor, and "Andy Asteroids" and "Snot a Problem" were originally programmed on the Super NES by Nick Jones and then converted to the Genesis.

The game's unique atmosphere, world, and characters were because the company had previously always been restricted to doing licensed games, like 7up's Cool Spot, where they had to conform to the other company's preset limitations. In that respect, the game was actually created as a satire of platform video games at the time. For instance, "Princess What's-Her-Name" was a parody of how numerous video games had throw-away female characters that needed to be saved.

=== Release ===
The original version was released for the Genesis in October 1994. A version for the Super NES was released shortly after the original and is largely the same as the Genesis version. The Super NES version has altered graphics, with different backgrounds and special effects, but lacked some sound effects and one of the levels from the Genesis version (titled "Intestinal Distress"). The stated reason for the Genesis version having the extra level was that the "Genesis version was more easily compressed and had the room for the bonus level". Subsequently, Nick Bruty stated in an interview that Sega asked Shiny Entertainment to add a level exclusively to the Sega version in exchange for reduced cartridge cost. Nick states that they designed the level overnight, and completed coding and testing the level in a single day (the day the game was sent to be printed to the consoles). The game was released in Japan for the Super Famicom on June 23, 1995 where it was published by Takara. The Japanese Mega Drive version was available exclusively via the Sega Channel service on December 1, 1995.

The game's Genesis release was promoted with a television commercial in which an elderly woman tells a bedtime story about Earthworm Jim while eating live earthworms (actually plastic props). The networks airing the commercial received so many complaints from nauseated viewers that the commercial was pulled in some markets, including stations in Portland, Spokane, and Sacramento.

The game's Special Edition was released for the Sega Genesis add-on, the Sega CD. It was based on the Genesis version, contained all of its levels, plus some extended sections and a single completely new level, titled "Big Bruty", a new remixed Red Book CD audio soundtrack, as well as around 1,000 more frames of in-game animation. These versions were also the only ones to contain alternate endings when winning on the "Easy" or "Difficult" modes, in which a narrator (Doug TenNapel) rambles on about many (false) facts on worms or congratulates the player in a similar absurd manner respectively. The Special Edition was later ported to Windows 95 by Activision.

Another special edition of the game was released exclusively through the Sega Channel for a contest dubbed The Great Earthworm Jim Race. This version included a secret room which, when reached by the first 200 players, would display a password and a toll-free telephone number. Those who called the number were awarded prizes.

Eurocom ported a compressed and scaled down version for the Game Boy. It was hindered by the lack of color, lack of graphical detail due to both processor and small screen size, choppy animations, and a lack of buttons, which made it hard to control. This version was also ported to the Game Gear, which included color graphics, but still suffered from all of the other problems of the Game Boy version. A direct port of the Game Gear version was also brought to the Master System, but only in Brazil. However, it only has 4 levels, and the boss in "What the Heck?" is missing.

A conversion of the game was also being developed by German studio Softgold and planned to be published by Atari Corporation for both the Atari Jaguar and the Atari Jaguar CD, but it was never finished due to the departure of Normen B. Kowalewski from Atari, who was the lead developer of the port, sometime between or at the end of 1995. The alpha prototype, which consisted of basic character animations, and the source code of the conversion are currently lost.

The game also had an MS-DOS port released in a package titled Earthworm Jim 1 & 2: The Whole Can 'O Worms (along with the MS-DOS port of Earthworm Jim 2) with redrawn graphics and missing the level "Intestinal Distress". The game was ported by Rainbow Arts.

In 2001, Game Titan ported the Super NES version to the Game Boy Advance. Despite the extra power of the Game Boy Advance, this version still ran very poorly, with bad animation and missing details, and was widely criticized.

The game was re-released digitally on some platforms in the late 2000s as well. The original Genesis version was released through Wii's Virtual Console service in Europe on October 3, 2008, in North America on October 27, 2008 and in Japan on December 16, 2008. The Genesis version was also re-released on the Nintendo Classics service on September 15, 2022. The MS-DOS version was re-released through DOSbox emulation on GOG.com on October 7, 2008, and on Steam on November 4, 2009.

Earthworm Jim had a marketing of $5 million.

Earthworm Jim is included in the Sega Genesis Mini console.

=== High-definition remake ===
In 2009, Gameloft released digitally an updated remake of the game on a number of mobile/handheld platforms. The remake was made entirely from scratch, without using the original game's code, and featured overhauled and smoothed graphics, a remixed soundtrack, a re-recorded voice of Jim, and touchscreen controls. Completely new, computer-themed levels were added. However, some previous features were lost. While the extended version of the "New Junk City" level from the "Special Edition" is included, "Big Bruty" ("Special Edition" new level) and "Who Turned Out the Lights?" (secret level from the original release) are not present. It was later released as a download for the Nintendo DSi as DSiWare, which is also downloadable on the Nintendo 3DS system. The only new addition for the DSiWare version was an extra minigame that involved the player using the system's camera on their own face, in order to mimic the same faces Jim would make on-screen. The Gameloft remake was also later released digitally on Xbox Live Arcade and PlayStation Network as "Earthworm Jim HD". It featured a comic book-like introduction, three new computer-themed bonus levels, and a 4-player multiplayer mode with special levels based on already existing ones.

== Reception ==
Reception

Aggregate scores
Aggregator	Score
GameRankings	81.17% (Genesis); 83% (SNES); 84% (IOS)
Metacritic	72/100 (GBA)

Review scores
Publication	Score
AllGame	4.5/5 (SNES); 4/5 (PC)
Electronic Gaming Monthly	9/10, 9/10, 9/10, 8/10 (Genesis); 8/10, 9/10, 9/10, 8/10, 8/10 (SNES); 9/10, 8.5/10, 9/10, 9/10(Sega CD); 6.5/10 (Game Gear)
Famitsu	6/10, 8/10, 7/10, 9/10 (SNES)
GameFan	98/100, 97/100, 98/100 (Sega CD)
Next Generation	4/5 (Genesis); 4/5 (Sega CD); 3/5 (GBA)
Maximum	4/5 (Windows 95)
Mega	92% (Mega Drive)
Computer Game Review	86/100, 79/100, 68/100 (Windows 95)

Award
Publication	Award
VideoGames	Best Genesis Game

The game received a positive reception upon release. Earthworm Jim was awarded Best Genesis Game of 1994 by Electronic Gaming Monthly, GamePro gave the Genesis version a perfect score, and Famicom Tsūshin scored the Super Famicom version of the game a 30 out of 40.

The game has been noted for its fluid animation, featuring a hand-drawn style that was unusual for 16-bit releases. GamePro argued that the game has "the most innovative gameplay since Sonic first raced onto the Genesis", backing up the point by noting "In the first level, New Junk City, Jim leaps off old tires, climbs strange crevices and cliffs, swings from chains, and creeps through a maze of garbage - and that's the most traditional level in the game!" Electronic Gaming Monthly gave rave reviews for both the Genesis and Super NES versions, praising animations, long levels, and a warped sense of humor. One of their reviewers summarized that "This game was made by a gamer, and it shows." Regarding the game's overall appeal, a review from GameZone stated "Back when platformers were the king of genres, Earthworm Jim made its presence known as the 'cool kid on the block' by appealing to many demographics. Obtaining a moderate difficulty level and establishing itself with stylish humor, Earthworm Jim was a financial and critical success for Interplay and Shiny Entertainment. Even though I feel the sequel is the best of the series, the original still is able to stand out on its own." The review also went on to praise the soundtrack from Mark Miller as well. Next Generation reviewed the Genesis version of the game, and stated that "Sure, it's only a slick 16bit platform game. And anyone looking for anything revolutionary will be disappointed - there's nothing strictly new here. But it's a whole load of fun, and that's what counts."

The Sega CD enhanced port was also well received. GamePro and Electronic Gaming Monthly remarked that whereas most Sega CD ports simply add enhanced music, Earthworm Jim included many worthwhile additions such as new animations, new levels, and the new homing missile weapon.

Electronic Gaming Monthly reviewed that the Game Gear version has impressive graphics by portable standards, but is crippled by the Game Gear's limited two-button control, frequent screen blurring, and frustrating difficulty. GamePro also felt the two-button control to be a serious problem, but concluded the Game Gear version to be "Overall ... fine for fans who want to take their EWJ show on the road."

Reviewing the Windows 95 version, Maximum claimed "it's not only a damn fine platform game, it's probably the best the PC has seen to date." They particularly praised the non-frustrating challenge and the strong personality of the graphics. Computer Game Review remarked, "If you found Pitfall, The Mayan Adventure entertaining, you'll want to check this one out." Computer Games Strategy Plus named the computer release of Earthworm Jim the best arcade title of 1995.

Next Generation reviewed the Sega CD version of Earthworm Jim: Special Edition, and stated that "While a prepackaged, presold character, who's as cynically calculated for hip success as Earthworm Jim does rub us the wrong way, we admit there was a cracking good game to back him up, and this new CD version is even better." Entertainment Weekly gave the game an A and wrote that the game is too similar to the Genesis and Super NES versions to warrant a new purchase.

However, later Gameloft remakes of the games received mixed reviews. Reception for the 2010 remake, Earthworm Jim HD, was less positive. IGN and GameSpot both said the surreal art style and animation stood the test of time, but felt some gameplay aspects and controls were dated in comparison to modern platformers. Similarly, the iPhone version of the game was criticized for its sloppy controls, mostly due to being touchscreen only.

In the United Kingdom, Earthworm Jim ranked fifth on the all-formats console sales chart for Christmas 1994 across its Mega Drive and Super Nintendo versions. The game sold more than 1 million copies worldwide by 1995.

Next Generation reviewed the Game Boy Advance version of the game, rating it three stars out of five, and stated that "Luckily, aside from some cheap hits, missed dodges, and blind jumps, everything else is pretty fun."

=== Accolades ===
Earthworm Jim was rated the 114th-best game made on a Nintendo System in Nintendo Power's Top 200 Games list. EGM gave it their "Game of the Month" award, and GamePro later awarded it Best Sega CD Game of 1995. In 2018, Complex rated the game 54th on their The Best Super Nintendo Games of All Time writing: "Earthworm Jim was unlike any other game out there at the time, and it's still quite original today. Its weird, surreal storyline was only made all the better by the solid platforming and shooting that went on here. We still love Earthworm Jim. Ga-roo-vy!" In 2017, Gamesradar ranked the game 19th on their "Best Sega Genesis/Mega Drive games of all time." They felt that the game's free-form shooting and platforming kept it fresh and relevant and called it "a jolly side-scrolling adventure". IGN listed Earthworm Jim 57th in their "Top 100 SNES Games of All Time." In 1995, Total! ranked the game 14th in its Top 100 SNES Games saying: "The game reeks of quality, plays like a dream, is hilariously funny and is packed with more original touches than anyone would have thought possible." In the same year, Flux magazine placed Earthworm Jim 7th on its Top 100 Video Games. They praised the game writing: "Intensely great gameplay. Wiggy, hilarious animation. Complex, richly rendered backgrounds."

== Legacy ==
A sequel, Earthworm Jim 2, was released in 1995. It was released in the same manner as the original; first on the Sega Genesis, and then ported to many other systems. It too was generally well received. Two further games, Earthworm Jim 3D for the Nintendo 64 and PC, and Earthworm Jim: Menace 2 the Galaxy for the Game Boy Color, were produced in 1999. However, they were developed without the involvement of Shiny Entertainment and were mostly met with negative reviews. An enhanced remake, Earthworm Jim PSP, by Atari was planned for a 2007 release for the PlayStation Portable, but was ultimately cancelled.

The game also inspired non-video game products, such as the Earthworm Jim television series, a comic book series, and a line of action figures. Earthworm Jim is playable as a standard character in ClayFighter 63⅓, and as a secret character in the "Sculptor's Cut" version of that game.
