= Marvel Absurd =

Marvel Comics imprint

- Status: defunct (1996)
- Founded: 1994
- Headquarters location: New York City, New York, United States
- Publication types: Comic books
- Fiction genres: Licensed property; Humor; Romance; Superhero; Adventure
- Owner: Marvel Entertainment Group, Inc.

Marvel Absurd was a Marvel Comics imprint under which comics based on Ren & Stimpy, Earthworm Jim and Beavis and Butt-Head were published.

== Beavis and Butt-Head ==
Beavis and Butt-Head comics were published between March 1994 and June 1996. The comic capitalized on the success of the animated television show. Rick Parker was an artist for the comic book.

== Earthworm Jim ==
Three issues of the comic were published, based on the animated television show of the time. It was written by Dan Slott and drawn by Barry Crain, Manny Galan and Carlos Garzon.

== Ren & Stimpy ==
Ren & Stimpy comic issues ran from #1–35 published by Marvel Comics, then subsequent issues #36–44 were published by Marvel Absurd.
