= Earthworm Jim =

Video game series from 1994

- Genre: Platform
- Developers: Shiny Entertainment; VIS Interactive; Gameloft; David A. Palmer Productions
- Publishers: Interplay Entertainment (1995) (1999–present); Activision (1995); Virgin Interactive (Europe Only); Playmates Interactive (1994–1995); Takara (1994-1996, Japan Only); Rockstar Games (1999, North America Only); Crave Entertainment (1999); Gameloft (2010)
- Creator: Doug TenNapel
- Platform: Various
- First release: Earthworm Jim; October 1994
- Latest release: Earthworm Jim HD; June 9, 2010

Earthworm Jim is a series of platform games featuring an earthworm named Jim who wears a robotic suit and battles the forces of evil. The series is noted for its platforming and shooting gameplay, surreal humor, and edgy art style. Four games were released in the series: Earthworm Jim, Earthworm Jim 2, Earthworm Jim 3D, and Earthworm Jim: Menace 2 the Galaxy, with the first game released in 1994. The series had lain dormant for almost a decade before Gameloft remade the original game in HD for PlayStation Network and Xbox Live Arcade in 2010. Interplay announced Earthworm Jim 4 in 2008; little to no information surfaced until May 2019 and August 2020, and development was believed cancelled by the rights owners by 2023, as it had never left pre-planning stages.

== Character ==
Jim is an ordinary earthworm who becomes a superhero after a robotic suit falls from the sky and lands on him. The suit gives him a humanlike body and superhuman powers, but outside it he remains a vulnerable worm. He carries a ray gun and uses his worm body as a whip to strike enemies and swing from hooks. He also travels through space on a small rocket called the Pocket Rocket.

Creator Doug TenNapel described Jim as foolish but good-hearted, with enough ability to become a hero despite his limited intelligence. His companion, Peter Puppy, is a dog who turns into a monster when angered. Jim's love interest is Princess What's-Her-Name, whose sister, Queen Slug-for-a-Butt, is one of his enemies. Another enemy, Psy-Crow, pursues Jim in an effort to steal his suit.

TenNapel provided Jim's voice in the original game, including his catchphrase "Groovy!" In the animated television series, Jim was voiced by Dan Castellaneta.

== History ==
=== Earthworm Jim ===
Playmates Toys, finding success with the license for Teenage Mutant Ninja Turtles, wanted to start their own franchise. Inspired by the success of the Sonic the Hedgehog series with Sonic the Hedgehog and Sonic the Hedgehog 2, they decided that they wanted to start the franchise as a video game, a rare approach at the time. From there, the game's design actually started with creator Doug TenNapel's simple sketch of an earthworm that he presented to Shiny Entertainment. Impressed, David Perry and the rest of Shiny bought the rights to Earthworm Jim from TenNapel, and started developing the game. From there, TenNapel would work on doing the game design, creating level ideas, and voicing Jim's character, while Perry and the other programmers created other characters and game mechanics.

The game's atmosphere, world, and characters were due to the fact that the company had previously always been restricted to doing licensed games, like 7up's Cool Spot, where they had to conform to the other company's preset limitations. In that respect, the game was actually created as a satire of platform video games at the time; for instance, "Princess What's-Her-Name" was a parody of how so many video games had throw-away female characters that exist only to be saved from danger.

The resulting game would be the original Earthworm Jim. The game would play as a 2D sidescrolling platformer with elements of a run and gun game as well. The player controls Jim and must maneuver him through the level while avoiding obstacles and enemies. The player can use Jim's gun as a method of shooting enemies, or his head a whip for whipping enemies. The whip move also allows the player to grab hold of, and swing from, certain hooks in the game. Some levels have additional requirements beyond merely getting to the end of the level. For example, the level "For Pete's Sake" involves making sure the computer-controlled Peter Puppy character gets through the level unharmed, which is accomplished by whipping him to make him jump over pits, and defeating enemies before they can damage him. Failure to do so results in Peter lashing out at Jim, taking health away from him.

The developers also created a wide variety of colorful villains for the game as well, including Psy-Crow, Queen Slug-for-a-Butt, Evil the Cat, Bob the Killer Goldfish, Major Mucus, and Professor Monkey-for-a-Head.

The game was very well-received on both the Genesis and the Super NES. It was awarded Best Genesis Game of 1994 by Electronic Gaming Monthly and was rated the 114th-best game made on a Nintendo System in Nintendo Power's Top 200 Games list. The game was noted for its fluid animation, featuring a hand-drawn style that was unusual for 16-bit releases.

A special version of the game, The Great Earthworm Jim Race, was broadcast in 1995 for the Sega Channel. The game featured an increase in difficulty level and a secret room which, when reached by the first 200 players, would display a password and a toll-free telephone number. Those that called the number were awarded special prizes, such as a book and action figures, as part of Jim's shortly-lived toyline from Playmates Toys. Shortly afterwards, the same development team started work on a sequel.

=== Earthworm Jim 2 ===
The premise of the sequel was largely the same as the original; traverse through the levels in order to save Princess What's-Her-Name and defeat the game's numerous enemies, namely Psy-Crow. While the majority of levels was still based on run and gun and platform game elements, separate levels incorporate different gameplay elements as well. Some levels, such as the opening level, "Anything but Tangerines", and the game's eighth level, "Level Ate", play largely the same as the original Earthworm Jim, with the exception of there being a larger variety of moves at the player's disposal. For instance, there are more types of guns to use once found in a level, such as an auto-aiming gun, or the "brick-wall" gun which takes out every enemy visible on the screen. Additionally, Jim's friend "Snot" travels with him, and can be used to stick and swing to other slimy green surfaces, or as a parachute, upon jumping.

Other levels stray much farther from this formula. In the third level, "The Villi People", the player must guide Jim, defenseless in the disguise of a blind cave salamander, through intestinal passages, while avoiding exploding sheep and hazards embedded in the floor and walls. The latter part of the level suddenly switches to a game show/trivia format, where the player has to answer nonsensical multiple choice questions that commonly have no logically correct answer. Another level, aptly titled "Inflated Head", has Jim's head inflated much like a balloon, and the player must control Jim as he floats upward, avoiding touching sharp objects which cause him to fall back down to the start of the level. Yet another plays as an isometric shooter, with Jim again on his "pocket rocket", where a balloon with a bomb must be directed to the end of the level, and defended from enemies. The last level of the game is not a typical boss fight, but rather, a race against Psy-Crow through an obstacle course, to get to Princess What's-Her-Name.

Earthworm Jim 2 was also well-received on the Genesis and Super NES, with some reviewers such as IGN and GameZone declaring it as better overall than the original. The game's humor, innovative gameplay, and "mini-game"-style levels spread throughout the game were also held in high regard as a welcome change from the linear gameplay common at the time, although some reviewers had mixed reactions to some of various different gameplay mechanics.

However, the game was later ported to the more advanced PlayStation and Sega Saturn systems, and those versions were generally criticized more due to not having any significant improvements despite the more powerful hardware.

=== Earthworm Jim 3D ===
Shortly after the release of Earthworm Jim 2, its original developer, Shiny Entertainment, was bought by Interplay Entertainment, and then put to work on other projects, most notably the PlayStation platformer Wild 9 for three years. Subsequently, the franchise was given to VIS Entertainment, and it was decided that, like many platform game series at the time (Super Mario, Sonic the Hedgehog et al.), gameplay would transition from 2D to 3D. Although development commenced shortly after Earthworm Jim 2, a lengthy three-year development cycle lent itself to the occasional belief that the project was destined to become vaporware.

Consequently, numerous problems and errors arose from this extended development cycle. One hurdle, early on, was the necessity to redesign the characters from side-scrolling 2D to free-roaming 3D, while the frame rate and animation were still causing issues with game development more than 70% complete. Error-wise, much of the content shown in previews and promotional material was either graphically different or removed from the final game; while the game's final packaging depicts Evil the Cat as the boss of the "Fear" level, Professor Monkey-for-a-Head became the actual in-game level boss. Also, many locations displayed in early versions of the game, such as a level set in a house wherein Jim is ant-sized, are non-existent in the released copy.

Additionally, original series designer David Perry had sold the rights to the franchise. Perry and original series creator Doug TenNapel were at first involved in the game as minor consultants, but were dismissed for unexplained reasons. Both expressed that they hated what was done with Earthworm Jim 3D, but legally could not prevent anything from happening. TenNapel said he felt the series was "ruined" by the game.

The game was considered neither a critical nor a commercial success. Many reviews called the game uninspired, mediocre, and unable to compete with several other similar, more highly reviewed platform games at the time, like Super Mario 64, Rayman 2, or Banjo-Kazooie.

=== Earthworm Jim: Menace 2 the Galaxy ===
A final, fourth Earthworm Jim game was released shortly after Earthworm Jim 3D in 1999. It was developed neither by the original team, nor the Earthworm Jim 3D team, but by David A. Palmer Productions and published by Crave Entertainment. The game played similarly to the first two games, but gameplay was greatly simplified, concentrating on exploring levels to collect items, rather than the constantly changing gimmicks present in the original two games. Levels typically involved goals such as collecting 100 or more coins to progress through levels, and if the player causes Jim to take too much damage, the player must start the level over again, with zero items collected. The game was poorly received as well, with reviewers complaining about the tedium of the collecting, and the game lacking the charm and style of the original games.

=== Dormancy and cancelled games ===
The series lay dormant for the first half of the decade. Rumors of a new Earthworm Jim game for the PlayStation Portable started in 2006. Referred to as Earthworm Jim, it was originally believed to be a remake of the original Earthworm Jim due to footage of Jim in a level very reminiscent of the "New Junk City" level from the first game. The game was formally announced at E3 2006 by Atari, who had obtained from Interplay a five-year license of the right to develop Earthworm Jim games for handheld devices. However, the game was reported to still be made by members of the original two titles, Earthworm Jim and Earthworm Jim 2, including Shiny Entertainment founder Dave Perry, Doug TenNapel, Nick Bruty, and Tommy Tallarico. The developers later announced that the game would be mostly new content, with elements of the earlier games included. Past characters to return in the game included Princess What's-Her-Name and Peter Puppy. The game was to retain the gameplay of the original two titles, playing as a 2D sidescrolling platform game with elements of a run and gun, but now with 3D computer graphics. It would be two-dimensional gameplay with three-dimensional graphics, much in the vein of Sonic Rivals or Klonoa: Door to Phantomile. Similar to the original two games, the gameplay consisted of maneuvering Jim through levels through running and jumping, and defeating enemies with a machine gun, and by using his head as a whip.

By August 2006, the game was reportedly 80% complete, and many video game journalists had hands-on playable builds of the game, such as GameSpot, GamesRadar, and IGN. It was scheduled for an early 2007 release. However, Atari quietly put the game "on hold" by mid-2007. The game was later reported as cancelled due to financial troubles. Financial problems at Atari caused it to sell off its internal development studios, including Shiny Entertainment, which it owned at the time, and ultimately to cease development on all of its game projects, including Earthworm Jim, by the end of 2007.

=== Remakes, re-releases and future ===
Interplay announced an Earthworm Jim 4 in 2008, but little has surfaced since. Series creator Doug TenNapel later denied work on it had ever started in 2010. However, Interplay referred to the game as "still in development" as of May 2011. In 2019, it was re-introduced as an exclusive release for the Intellivision Amico, stated then as to be developed by the original team from the 1990s; the game was announced to release as a launch title for the Amico in the 2020s. In early 2023, video game website Time Extension reached out to members of the development staff for an update on the game; while none outright confirmed its cancellation, Jones stated that he had not done any work beyond initial brainstorming sessions years prior, similar to Perry, who had assumed the game was on hold. This led to their general belief that the game had been cancelled.

In 2008, the two original Earthworm Jim games were re-released on platforms such as the Wii's Virtual Console, PlayStation Network, and Xbox Live. The original was also ported to iOS for play on iPhones as well.

In 2010, a remake of the original game, titled Earthworm Jim HD, was released on PlayStation Network for the PlayStation 3, and Xbox Live for Xbox 360. In 2018 Earthworm Jim HD was removed from PlayStation Network and Xbox Live.

Earthworm Jim is included on the NA/PAL version of the Sega Genesis Mini, which was released on September 19, 2019.

== In other media ==
Earthworm Jim also starred as a fighter on Interplay's Nintendo 64 title Clay Fighter 63 1/3 in 1997 and the Blockbuster rental title Clay Fighter 63 1/3: Sculptors Cut in 1998. In the original, Jim was a default character, however in the Sculptor's Cut, he was required to be unlocked. Also in the game, he and Boogerman hold a strong rivalry between one another.

A line of Earthworm Jim toys and action figures was released in late 1995. In 1995 03vel Comics published a 3-issue comic based on the character. In May 2019 Doug TenNapel raised money through Indiegogo to self-publish a new Earthworm Jim graphic novel called Launch the Cow. The comic book successfully raised more than $100,000 in its first 24 hours on Indiegogo and nearly $900,000 over the course of its crowdfunding campaign. A crowdfunding campaign for a second new comic book, Earthworm Jim 2: Fight the Fish, was announced in August 2020; this also eclipsed the $100,000 threshold in its first day.

Shiny has also made references to Earthworm Jim in its later titles; their game Sacrifice features an earthworm-like god of earth called James, and there were additional references in the game MDK. Earthworm Jim also appears as a secret character in the first Battle Arena Toshinden game for PC.

=== Television series ===
Universal Cartoon Studios made an animated series based on the franchise, and it ran for 23 episodes in 2 seasons from 1995 to 1996 on the Kids' WB programming block on The WB Television Network (now merged with UPN to form The CW). The show maintains much of the absurd and surreal humor of the original games, as well as introducing its own features. Most of the episodes revolve around one of Jim's many enemies trying to reclaim the super suit or otherwise cause mayhem throughout the galaxy. Actor Dan Castellaneta, known for voicing various characters on The Simpsons, including its main protagonist, Homer Simpson, voiced Jim in the animated series.

== Reception and legacy ==
The original two Earthworm Jim games of the series have been praised for their detailed graphics, well-developed platforming, and wacky humor. The original game was received very well, being rated the 114th best game made on a Nintendo system in Nintendo Power's Top 200 Games list. Earthworm Jim 2 was also received very well. Both were better received than many of the other projects Interplay was working on around the same time, such as Boogerman, which was criticized as being "cretinous, disgusting, and patronizing", and Cool Spot, a project Perry and Tallarico worked on, which was criticized for being dedicated to marketing 7-Up and for having a "lack of personality".

The music from Earthworm Jim has been praised, with music from Earthworm Jim 2 being included in Game Central's Best of the Best CD compilation of video game music. It has also been requested at concerts where game composer Tommy Tallarico has had his music performed.

The first two games were compiled into a package called Earthworm Jim 1 & 2: The Whole Can 'O Worms for the PC. Next Generation reviewed the package, rating it four stars out of five, and stated that "This is what the PC really needs sometimes – a nice, fast-action game that will distract the player from the more mundane pursuits of word processing or data entry, without requiring the commitment of a huge RPG or strategy title."

Earthworm Jim 3D started a downward trend for the series' popularity, being considered neither a critical nor commercial success, with many reviewers claiming the game was uninspired, mediocre, and unable to compete with many other similar, higher reviewed platform games at the time, such as Super Mario 64, Rayman 2, or Banjo-Kazooie. Earthworm Jim: Menace 2 the Galaxy was even more poorly received, with reviewers claiming it had lost the charm of what made the originals good, and pretty much "killed the series".

IGN recognized the character Earthworm Jim as a notable animal protagonist in video games.
