= Earthworm Jim 4 =

Proposed video game

- Publisher: Interplay Entertainment
- Series: Earthworm Jim
- Platform: Intellivision Amico

Earthworm Jim 4 is a proposed video game in the Earthworm Jim series. It was originally announced by Interplay Entertainment in 2008, and referred to by Interplay as "still in development" in May 2011. Later commentary over the next decade from individual developers would contest its development status, until May 2019, when it was announced that the game was being developed for the Intellivision Amico console. Lack of updates in the years following has again led to the belief that the game is on hold or cancelled.

== Development ==
=== Announcement ===
Following the quiet cancellation of a planned Earthworm Jim title for PSP in mid-2007, rumors of a new Earthworm Jim game arose as early as November 2007, when Interplay, who had previously halted game development due to financial trouble, announced that they were restarting game development, listing Earthworm Jim as a series they would resurrect. The game was officially announced as Earthworm Jim 4 shortly after this, on April 22, 2008. Interplay also announced that original Earthworm Jim creator and voice actor Doug TenNapel would return as a "creative consultant". While no details were released in regards to which video game console it would be released on, or a prospective release date, the company did announce the intention to release a new animated television series, and eventually a feature film, to tie in with the game.

=== Early development ===
No further news was announced on the game for over two years, until April 2010, when rumors arose that TenNapel had started confirming details about the game, most notably that he was actively working on the game, and that it would be a title for the Nintendo Wii. TenNapel later addressed all the rumors as false; he had not been working on an Earthworm Jim 4 at all, nor had any work been done on it in general. TenNapel said in his statement:

Interplay actually wants to do the game right! We've been talking about a game now for two years. They want me to be involved, but times in games are tough right now for everyone. They have to raise a lot of money to fund the game properly... In our early discussions about the game, we had tentatively brainstormed ideas for the Wii. That is NOT a confirmation like the guy posted. We haven't presented the idea to Nintendo... As with anything in the gaming industry, the whole thing could turn on a dime and many of the facts can change about the game. What these fans don't understand is how squirly things are at the beginning of the game. It would take at least two years to bring out the game and that's after we've confirmed the budget and platform. The game could just as easily go away, get moved to the iPhone or become a Jim Tetris knock off as come out as a game on the Wii. People don't understand how unstable game design is at the start.

TenNapel also emphasized the importance of getting the original team members back together (such as David Perry and Nick Bruty) and being able to adapt to the higher production values and demands of the current generation of video game consoles. Overall, he said that while Interplay was still interested in doing the game, no development, or terms of it, had been completed.

Another year passed before anything was heard about the game again. In May 2011, Interplay announced that they were experiencing financial troubles again, including "substantial debt" and continued operating losses, and that could leave many future games in jeopardy. Despite TenNapel's comments a year prior, in these reports, Interplay listed the game as "Earthworm Jim 4, a project still in development but at an unknown state."

At the "Develop" conference in July 2012, Shiny Entertainment founder David Perry released a statement that he's sure there will be another Earthworm Jim game. He claimed the problem was "when", not "if", as, while the development team members discuss the project actively, they are all busy with their separate projects and companies. A possible premise he outlined was as follows:

The thing we had talked about in the past is Jim had been in retirement...So, he's been sitting at home watching movies and eating popcorn. He's grossly overweight now. The plan was to start with him literally getting off the sofa, and it's a disaster because he just hasn't done anything since. But he's got to get back into action again.

While details regarding just how much Jim being out of shape would affect game design are still up in the air, Perry mentioned being pretty certain that the game would be played in 2D. In October 2015, original Earthworm Jim lead artist Nick Bruty held a Reddit AMA, where he addressed the issues that the fourth title fell into, stating:

Oh man. A new EWJ game with the original team almost happened about 5 years ago but a deal with the IP owners couldn't get worked out. I think everyone would be up for it sometime. Feels like unfinished business but hard to align everyone. I wouldn't do it without the key players.

=== Intellivision Amico development ===
In May 2019, a new Earthworm Jim game was announced by Intellivision Entertainment President and Earthworm Jim 1 and Earthworm Jim 2 composer Tommy Tallarico. The game would have been an exclusive for the since-abandoned Intellivision Amico video game console. Members of the original development team involved with the project include Doug TenNapel (creator and voice actor), Tommy Tallarico (composer and sound designer), David Perry (programmer), Nick Bruty (lead artist), Nicholas Jones (programmer), Tom Tanaka (level designer), Steve Crow (background artist), Edward Schofield (animator), and Mike Dietz (animator). When pressed for details after TenNapel's controversial opinions against the Black Lives Matter movement, he and Tallarico clarified that TenNapel was only involved as an unofficial consultant.

The development team hosted a livestream of members' initial plans for the game on May 4, 2019. Details announced included that the game would be played from 2D perspective, consistent with the series' original two games; but, unlike those games, would contain local multi-player gameplay. The game would not be a reboot of the previous games, potentially containing both prequel and sequel elements. The final title of the game also remained under discussion.

The game was scheduled to release sometime after the release of Amico console, which was originally scheduled to release in October 2020, but was delayed due to the COVID-19 pandemic to April 2021 and later October 2021. In August 2020, alongside news of the first delay of the console, the game's first gameplay trailer was released.

In early 2023, video game website Time Extension reached out to members of the development staff for an update on the game; while none outright confirmed its cancellation, Jones stated that he had not done any work beyond initial brainstorming sessions years prior, similar to Perry, who had assumed the game was on hold, leading to the general belief that the game had been cancelled.
