= Fox N Forests =

2018 video game

Fox n Forests
- Developer: Bonus Level Entertainment
- Publisher: EuroVideo Medien GmbH
- Platforms: Linux, macOS, Windows, PlayStation 4, Xbox One, Nintendo Switch
- Release: 17 May 2018; Xbox One; 30 May 2018
- Genre: Platform
- Mode: Single-player

Fox n Forests (stylized as FOX n FORESTS) is a video game developed by German studio Bonus Level Entertainment and published by EuroVideo Medien GmbH for Microsoft Windows, PlayStation 4, Xbox One, and Nintendo Switch. It was released on 17 May 2018. Fox n Forests is a side-scrolling platform game with retro-style graphics.

== Gameplay ==
The player controls Rick, an anthropomorphic fox who is tasked with restoring order to the forest by recovering stolen bark. Players progress through levels with the help of the ability to change seasons instantly, which also consumes magic.

== Plot ==
Rick, a mischievous fox, plays a trick on a bird. As consequence, the bird escorts Rick to the old Season Tree. There, the tree tasks Rick with the mission of recovering stolen bark to restore balance to the forest.

== Development ==
Fox n Forests was the subject of a Kickstarter in 2016, where Bonus Level raised €107,875 to fund development.

== Release ==
The game debuted digitally on most platforms on May 17, 2018. Its Xbox One launch followed on May 30, 2018.

Strictly Limited Games began accepting orders for physical copies of the game in Europe on Nintendo Switch and PlayStation 4 on November 18 and 25, 2018. Limited Run Games began accepting orders for a North American PlayStation 4 physical release from May 10 to June 9, 2024.

== Reception ==
Reception

Aggregate scores
Aggregator	Score
Metacritic	PS4: 65/100; NS: 66/100; PC: 69/100; XONE: 71/100
OpenCritic	40% recommend

Review score
Publication	Score
Nintendo Life	6/10

Fox n Forests received "mixed or average" reviews across all platforms, according to review aggregator Metacritic. Fellow review aggregator OpenCritic assessed that the game received fair approval, being recommended by 40% of critics. Nintendo Life rated the Switch version a 6/10, praising its use of the "inventive" season-changing mechanic, but criticized its controls and short story. Hardcore Gamer gave the game a 4/5, praising the game's old school graphics. Destructoid (7/10) also enjoyed the graphics and user interface, though criticizing weapon restrictions. PlayStation Universe (9/10) acknowledged: "Chock full of an overwhelming supply of retro-gaming goodness, FOX n FORESTS will take retro fans back to a happier time with an all-new adventure to experience."

The Switch version of Fox n Forests sold more copies than other systems: three times more than PC and four times more than PlayStation 4.

== Remake ==
Finnigan Fox was announced for the Intellivision Amico on August 5, 2020. Initially described as an "original game", the title is a remake of Fox N Forests with overhauled visuals, rewritten dialogue, additional levels, new music and a multiplayer mode. The alterations were made to make the game more accessible to a broader audience.

In July 2021, Intellivision began selling physical game products for both Europe and North America that did not contain the game. The game launched on the eShop for Nintendo Switch and on Steam for Windows devices on June 19, 2025.
