= Shotgun (rock band) =

American rock band

- Origin: Dallas, Texas, U.S.
- Genres: Rock
- Years active: 1970s
- Labels: ShroomAngel
- Past members: Guy Houston; Hugh Coleman; John Michael Soria; Russ Skarsten; Billy Metcalf

Shotgun were a 1970s rock band from the Dallas area in Texas. The members were Guy Houston on drums, Hugh Coleman on bass, John Michael Soria on lead guitar, Russ Skarsten on keyboards, and Billy Metcalf on lead vocals.

The band's 1976 album Dallasian Rock was remastered and reissued by ShroomAngel Records, in 2014. Reviewing the album for seaoftranquility.org, Pete Pardo awarded the album five stars and said: "This is incredible material that should have been huge back in the day, and the amazing thing is it still sounds fresh and exciting here in 2014. The ShroomAngel team have done a wonderful job on the remastering, so be prepared for a killer listening experience." Michael Insuaste, reviewing the album for jammagazine.com, said: "Owner Rich Patz has once again recovered disregarded tapes from one of Dallas' favorite 70's local rock band and released their 11 track studio recordings on his label that is slowly getting recognition from old and new fans alike. Patz, a diligent music aficionado, is on a mission to sniff out lost recordings and re-release them with an improved sound and impressive packaging.

Shotgun Revisited, issued as a download album on reverbnation.com by Scarwinds Records, includes 15 songs, including some of those from Dallasian Rock. The band were described as having "dominated the Dallas-Ft. Worth music scene from 1974 thru 1976." Apart from Hugh Coleman, the band also included Bill Randolf and Charlie Stephens on bass. In 2006 singer Chelsey Austin released a CD singing to the music of the band, edited and remixed by drummer/producer Guy Houston.
