= Shotgun wedding (disambiguation) =

A shotgun wedding is a wedding hastily arranged due to an unplanned pregnancy.

Shotgun Wedding can also refer to:

- Shotgun Wedding (1993 film), Australian film based on the Wally Melish siege, directed by Paul Harmon
- Shotgun Wedding (2013 film), American comedy film directed by Danny Roew
- Shotgun Wedding (2022 film), American romantic action comedy film, directed by Jason Moore
- Shotgun Wedding, a low-budget 1963 film written by Ed Wood
- Shotgun Wedding (album), 1991 album by Lydia Lunch and Rowland S. Howard
- Shotgun Wedding, an album by the band Bride
- "Shotgun Wedding", a 1965/66/72 single by Roy C
- "Shotgun Wedding" (Bugs), a 1995 television episode
