= Earthworm Jim 2 =

1995 video game

- Developer: Shiny Entertainment (Note: MS-DOS version developed by Rainbow Arts; PlayStation and Saturn versions developed by Screaming Pink; Game Boy Advance version developed by SuperEmpire.)
- Publishers: NA: Playmates Interactive Entertainment; EU: Virgin Interactive Entertainment; PlayStation; Virgin Interactive Entertainment; Game Boy Advance; Majesco
- Producers: David A. Luehmann; Scott Herrington
- Designers: David Perry; Doug TenNapel
- Programmers: Andy Astor; Nicholas Jones
- Artists: Nick Bruty; Stephen Crow; Mark Lorenzen; Mike Dietz
- Composers: Tony Bernetich; Christopher Beck
- Series: Earthworm Jim
- Platforms: Genesis/Mega Drive, Super Nintendo Entertainment System, MS-DOS, Sega Saturn, PlayStation, Game Boy Advance
- Release: November 15, 1995: Genesis/Mega Drive; NA: November 15, 1995; EU: December 22, 1995 Super NES; NA: November 15, 1995; EU: January 25, 1996 MS-DOS; NA: April 30, 1996; EU: 1996 Saturn; NA: May 15, 1996; EU: October 1996 PlayStation; EU: November 1996 Game Boy Advance; NA: June 5, 2002; EU: November 29, 2002
- Genre: Run and gun
- Mode: Single-player

Earthworm Jim 2 is a 1995 run and gun video game developed by Shiny Entertainment and published by Playmates Interactive Entertainment. It is the sequel to Earthworm Jim, the second game in the Earthworm Jim series. It was released in late 1995 and early 1996 depending on the region and video game console, initially for the Sega Genesis and Super Nintendo Entertainment System, before being ported to other platforms.

== Gameplay ==
Snott slowing Jim's descent

The purpose of the game is largely the same as it was in the original Earthworm Jim; traverse through the levels in order to save Princess What's-Her-Name from Psy-Crow. However, gameplay is much more diverse than the original.

While the majority of levels are still based on run and gun and platformer elements, separate levels incorporate different gameplay mechanics as well. Some levels, like the opening level, "Anything but Tangerines", and the eighth level, "Level Ate", play mostly the same as the original Earthworm Jim, with the exception of there being a larger variety of moves at the player's disposal. For instance, there are more types of guns to use once found in a level, like an auto-aiming gun, or the "Barn Blaster" gun which takes out every enemy visible on the screen. New power-ups include the chip butty, which increases Jim's suit power to 200%. Additionally, Jim's friend, Snott, travels with him and can be used to stick to and swing from other slimy green surfaces or as a parachute upon jumping.

Other levels stray much further from this formula. In the third level, "Villi People", the player must guide Jim, in the disguise of a blind cave salamander, through intestinal passages, while avoiding exploding sheep and hazards embedded in the floors and walls. The latter part of the level suddenly switches to a game show/trivia format, where the player has to answer nonsensical multiple choice questions that commonly have no logically correct answer. Another level, aptly titled "Inflated Head", has Jim's head inflated like a balloon, and the player must control Jim as he floats upward, avoiding sharp objects which cause him to fall back down to the start, all the while dodging Evil the Cat's attacks.

Another level, "The Flyin' King", plays as an isometric shooter, which includes Jim on his "pocket rocket", where a balloon with a bomb must be directed to the end of the level, and defended from enemies, in order to defeat Major Mucus. The last level, "See Jim Run Run Jim Run", is not a typical boss fight, but a race against Psy-Crow through an obstacle course to get to Princess What's-Her-Name. The game ends with Jim saving the Princess, but all three characters eventually turn out to be cows in disguise.

== Development ==
In an April 1995 interview, Shiny Entertainment president David Perry stated that Earthworm Jim 2 was expected to be released by Christmas of that year.

At E3 in May 1995, Shiny Entertainment demonstrated the sequel, which was being developed as a 24-megabit Mega Drive cartridge. According to Sega Magazin, seven levels had been established by that stage, including "Lorenzo's Soil", "Wormburger", "Peter, Pound & Mary" and "Villi People". The developers had expanded the variety of gameplay, introducing activities such as guiding Jim through the ground, rescuing falling puppies and navigating a three-dimensional flying sequence. The game also featured improved sprite animation and backgrounds rendered using Silicon Graphics computers. Five additional weapons were introduced, bringing the total to seven, including a bubble gun.

== Release ==
The game, much like the first, was developed for the Sega Genesis and then ported to the Super NES. They were released virtually simultaneously and were largely the same game, the only differences being that the Super NES version had alternate background art, and the ability to switch weapons. The Genesis version was released in Japan exclusively via the Sega Channel service. Rainbow Arts ported the game to MS-DOS along with the first game, in a package titled "Earthworm Jim 1 & 2: The Whole Can 'O Worms". This port featured an upgraded CD-DA music soundtrack, more voice clips and redrawn graphics, but lacked the "Lorenzen's Soil" level. Versions for the Sega Saturn and PlayStation (both developed by a separate studio, Screaming Pink, Inc.) were also released, which contained the upgraded audio and all of the levels from the original. Both of these versions were identical and contained background art and graphical differences separate from any other versions. In a 1994 conference held on CompuServe with Shiny Entertainment prior to its release, David Perry stated that they were considering making a version for the Atari Jaguar, which never came to fruition.

Many years later, it was ported to a newer generation of systems. A Game Boy Advance port, developed by Russian studio SuperEmpire Inc, based on the Super NES release, was released in 2002. It has been widely criticized for poor graphics, bad sound and music, and very glitchy gameplay. The Genesis version was later released for download on the Wii via the Virtual Console in 2009. The MS-DOS version was re-released through DOSbox emulation on GOG.com and Steam. The Super NES version was re-released on the Nintendo Classics service in March 2022.

== Reception ==
Reception

Review scores
| Publication | Score | | | | |
| Publication | GBA | PS | Saturn | Sega Genesis | SNES |
|---|---|---|---|---|---|
| AllGame | N/A | N/A | 4.5/5 | 4.5/5 | 4.5/5 |
| Computer and Video Games | N/A | 3/10 | N/A | N/A | N/A |
| Electronic Gaming Monthly | N/A | N/A | N/A | 6.5/10; 8.5/10; 8.5/10; 8/10 | N/A |
| Famitsu | N/A | N/A | 6/10, 9/10, 7/10, 6/10 | N/A | N/A |
| GamePro | N/A | N/A | N/A | 5/5; 4.5/5; 5/5; 5/5 | 4.5/5; 4.5/5; 4.5/5; 4.5/5 |
| GameSpot | 2/10 | N/A | N/A | N/A | N/A |
| Hyper | N/A | N/A | N/A | 93/100 | 93/100 |
| IGN | 4/10 | N/A | N/A | N/A | N/A |
| M! Games | N/A | N/A | N/A | 76% | N/A |
| Next Generation | N/A | N/A | 3/5 | 4/5 | N/A |
| Nintendo Life | N/A | N/A | N/A | 7/10 | N/A |
| Official Nintendo Magazine | N/A | N/A | N/A | N/A | 91/100 |
| Play | N/A | 69% | N/A | N/A | N/A |
| Super Game Power | N/A | N/A | N/A | N/A | 4.8/5 |
| Super Play | N/A | N/A | N/A | N/A | 85% |
| Total! | N/A | N/A | N/A | N/A | 90/100 |
| Video Games (DE) | N/A | 78% | 80% | N/A | N/A |
| VideoGames & Computer Entertainment | N/A | N/A | N/A | 9/10 | N/A |
| Sega Saturn Magazine | N/A | N/A | N/A | N/A | N/A |

Reception for the game was very positive. Sources such as IGN and GameZone declared it as better overall than the original, which was also very well received. Destructoid praised the humor, innovative gameplay, and "minigame" style levels spread throughout the game were also held in high regard as a welcome change from the linear gameplay common at the time. Reviewing the Genesis version, one reviewer for Electronic Gaming Monthly disapproved of the game, remarking "where the first had technique, this one just gets cheap", but the remaining three declared it a worthy sequel. They commented that it retains the same great gameplay of the original while adding excellent new weapons and levels "which are even crazier than before". Reviewers for GamePro gave positive reviews for both the Genesis and Super NES versions. They noted that the basic gameplay and premise are unchanged from the first game, but highly praised the new level designs, diverse soundtrack, and improved animations for the title character, with one of the reviewers concluding "Earthworm Jim 2 manages to exceed the lofty standards of the first game." A reviewer for Next Generation felt that the inventive new level designs were more than enough to make the game feel fresh despite it using the same gameplay. He summarized that "For the most part, this long-awaited sequel has answered the success of the first installment using more of the same humor, action, and skill, adding a few surprises this time around." Sega Saturn Magazine (previously Sega Magazine) gave the Genesis version a 94%, citing the variety of gameplay styles with "every one, in every way, sickeningly well implemented."

While the Genesis and Super NES versions were generally held in high regard, some of the other versions were more poorly received. The PlayStation port, which contained the same content as the original releases, received a 3/10 score from Computer and Video Games, due to there being no significant improvements, despite the more powerful hardware of the PlayStation. The Sega Saturn version, though generally well received, also encountered similar criticism, with Sega Saturn Magazine describing Earthworm Jim 2 as an excellent game, but derided the lack of advancements in the Saturn version, and summarized it as "a great game – a year ago. On a different console." A Next Generation critic was more forgiving of the lack of major enhancements, contending that "the title is amazingly fun even on a machine designed for 3D gaming", though he acknowledged those who had already played the Genesis or Super NES version would have no reason to play the game again on the Saturn. GamePro's Major Mike disagreed, contending that changes such as the new backgrounds, remixed music, and loading screens make the game feel fresh and new.

The 2002 Game Boy Advance release was panned by critics as well, but this time due to the game having an "unfinished" engine, glitched graphics, and an unpredictable save system. IGN stated "the action tends to slow down in the most unlikely locations ...and the gameplay's inconsistent...load a game where you instantly die for no apparent reason". GameSpot felt similarly, calling it "unplayable". GameSpot nominated Earthworm Jim 2 for its 2002 "Most Disappointing Game on Game Boy Advance" and "Worst Game on Game Boy Advance" awards. Reviewing the Virtual Console release of the Genesis version, Marcel van Duyn of Nintendo Life had mixed reactions on various different gameplay mechanics.

=== Accolades ===
Earthworm Jim 2 was nominated for the Video Software Dealers Association's "Video Game of the Year" in 1995, losing to Donkey Kong Country 2. In 1996, GamesMaster ranked the Mega Drive version second in their "The GamesMaster Mega Drive Top 10." In 1998, Saturn Power listed the Saturn version 90th in their Top 100 Sega Saturn Games. IGN rated the game 40th on its "Top 100 SNES Games of All Time." They praised the Snott dynamic that it added a lot to the gameplay experience.

== Sequels ==
The Earthworm Jim series had future sequels, including Earthworm Jim 3D and Earthworm Jim: Menace 2 the Galaxy. They were made by different developers, with vastly dissimilar gameplay and styles, and received generally negative reception.
