= Ron Claiborne =

American journalist

- Born: Ronald Eldridge Claiborne; August 20, 1953 (age 72); San Francisco, California U.S.
- Education: Yale University (B.A.); Columbia University (M.J.)
- Occupations: Journalist; News Anchor
- Years active: 1976–2018
- Notable credit(s): ABC News (1986–2018); Good Morning America (2004–2018)

Ronald Eldridge Claiborne (born August 20, 1953) is a retired American journalist and correspondent for ABC News. He was the "more news reporter" for the weekend edition of Good Morning America, anchored by Dan Harris and Paula Faris.

== Early life ==
Ronald Eldridge Claiborne was born in San Francisco, California on August 20, 1953. He attended and graduated from Yale University with a B.A. in psychology and a master's degree from the Columbia University Graduate School of Journalism. Claiborne's journalism career began in 1976 when he first worked at an independent newspaper based in Richmond, California.

== Career ==
Claiborne worked as general assignment correspondent for independent WNYW-TV in New York City. Claiborne was also a reporter for the New York Daily News (1980–1982). He covered areas such as metropolitan news, city politics and city hall and state government. During the late 1970s, Claiborne served as reporter and editor for the United Press International wire service.

Claiborne joined ABC News in 1986 as a general assignment correspondent based in Boston and he frequently reported and contributed to World News, Nightline and Good Morning America. He covered a wide variety of stories for ABC News, topics includes the legalization of gay marriages in Massachusetts; the Boston Catholic Church scandal in 2002; the Elian Gonzales custody battle; the Yugosalavia conflict in Belgrade; the Persian Gulf War and both the 1992 and 2008 U.S. presidential campaigns where he covered Senator John McCain's campaign. Claiborne retired from ABC News and Good Morning America in September 2018.

== Awards ==
Claiborne was awarded an Emmy in 2000, for his coverage of the seizure of Elian Gonzales in Miami.
