= Earthworm Jim HD =

2010 video game

- Developer: Gameloft
- Publisher: Gameloft
- Producer: Patrick Wagner
- Designers: Stephane Varrault; Lin Xiao Xiao
- Artist: Arthur Hugot
- Composer: Diego Zaldivar
- Series: Earthworm Jim
- Platforms: Xbox 360 (Xbox Live Arcade); PlayStation 3 (PlayStation Network); Windows Phone
- Release: Xbox Live Arcade: WW: June 9, 2010; PlayStation 3: WW: August 3, 2010; Windows Phone: WW: October 25, 2010; NA: November 8, 2010
- Genre: Platform shoot 'em up
- Modes: Single-player, multiplayer

Earthworm Jim HD is a high definition remake of the original Earthworm Jim video game. While the original was released in 1994 for the Sega Genesis and then ported to many other platforms, the remake was released digitally through XBLA on Xbox 360 on June 9, 2010, through the PSN on the PlayStation 3 on August 3, 2010, and for Windows Phone 7 alongside its launch in October and November of 2010. While critics had mixed feelings with regard to how well the game had aged, they generally praised the new content, mainly the cooperative multiplayer mode.

The game was removed from the PlayStation Network, Xbox Live and Windows Phone stores in February 2018.

== Gameplay ==
The core gameplay is still left intact from the original. The game plays as a 2D computer graphics sidescrolling platform game with elements of a run and gun game. The player controls Jim and must maneuver him through the level while avoiding obstacles and enemies. The player can use Jim's gun as a method of shooting enemies, or his head as a whip for whipping enemies.

While levels are faithfully recreated in the remake, it does not feature the original's secret level "Who Turned Out the Light", or "Big Bruty" level that was only present in the special edition version of the game. It does feature three new levels and other extra content, such as a boss fight against Pitch the Cat, a reference to "Keyboard Cat". Achievements were also added to the game. New difficulty settings, both easier and harder than the original, were also included.

=== Multiplayer ===
The main addition to the gameplay is the inclusion of a 4 player cooperative online multiplayer mode. The game contains new levels, not present in the original release, which can be played with up to four players both locally or over the internet, and involve teamwork-based puzzles and gameplay. There are fifteen multi-player levels in total. Achievements can also be unlocked in the multiplayer portion of the game, rewarding players for being "No. 1' in each Xbox Live multiplayer level".

== Development ==
Gameloft signed an agreement in 2009 with Interplay Entertainment to have the rights to develop, publish, and distribute games related to the Earthworm Jim series. This agreement lead to a port of the game, without new content, for the Wii's WiiWare, and the high definition remake for PlayStation 3 and Xbox 360. The game does not use the original game's code, but rather, the remake was entirely recreated. None of the game's new content was approved by Doug TenNapel, original Earthworm Jim creator, nor was any of the original game's staff involved. In addition to the game's updated high definition graphics, the game's soundtrack was remastered and Jim's voice acting was re-recorded. As such, TenNapel no longer voices Jim as he did in the original. A short, comic book-style introduction was added to the game's introduction as well, which originally hailed from the game's strategy guide.

== Reception ==
Reception

Aggregate score
Aggregator	Score
Metacritic	73/100 (X360); 70/100 (PS3)

Review scores
Publication	Score
1Up.com	C+
GameSpot	6/10
IGN	7/10
Official Xbox Magazine (UK)	9/10
Play	8.9/10

Earthworm Jim HD received "mixed or average" reviews according to review aggregator Metacritic, with critics generally feeling that while some parts had not aged well, the game was still enjoyable due to nostalgia and inclusion of new content, mainly the multiplayer mode. IGN did not feel the game had entirely aged well, stating "while this is technically a solid remake, the design choices of the original Earthworm Jim continue to hurt the experience, especially for gamers accustomed to the conveniences of modern platformers (jumping and shooting simultaneously...)" They did praise the new multiplayer mode for "running well". 1UP.com similarly complained that the original's gameplay mechanics had not aged well, but strongly praised the newly added multiplayer mode, comparing it favorably to LittleBigPlanet. GameSpot concluded that "...it's impressive that Earthworm Jim HD is still crazy after all these years, the game would be a lot more playable today with some concessions to modernity...Purists who fondly remember playing the original game on the Genesis might just love this trip back in time; everybody else will wonder what the fuss was about."

Official Xbox Magazine (UK) was especially positive regarding the game, stating that it was "...a brilliant example of how games should be remade and remixed on XBLA". Play, the UK magazine, was similarly positive, referring to it as "A highly impressive update".
