= Intellivision Amico =

Video game console

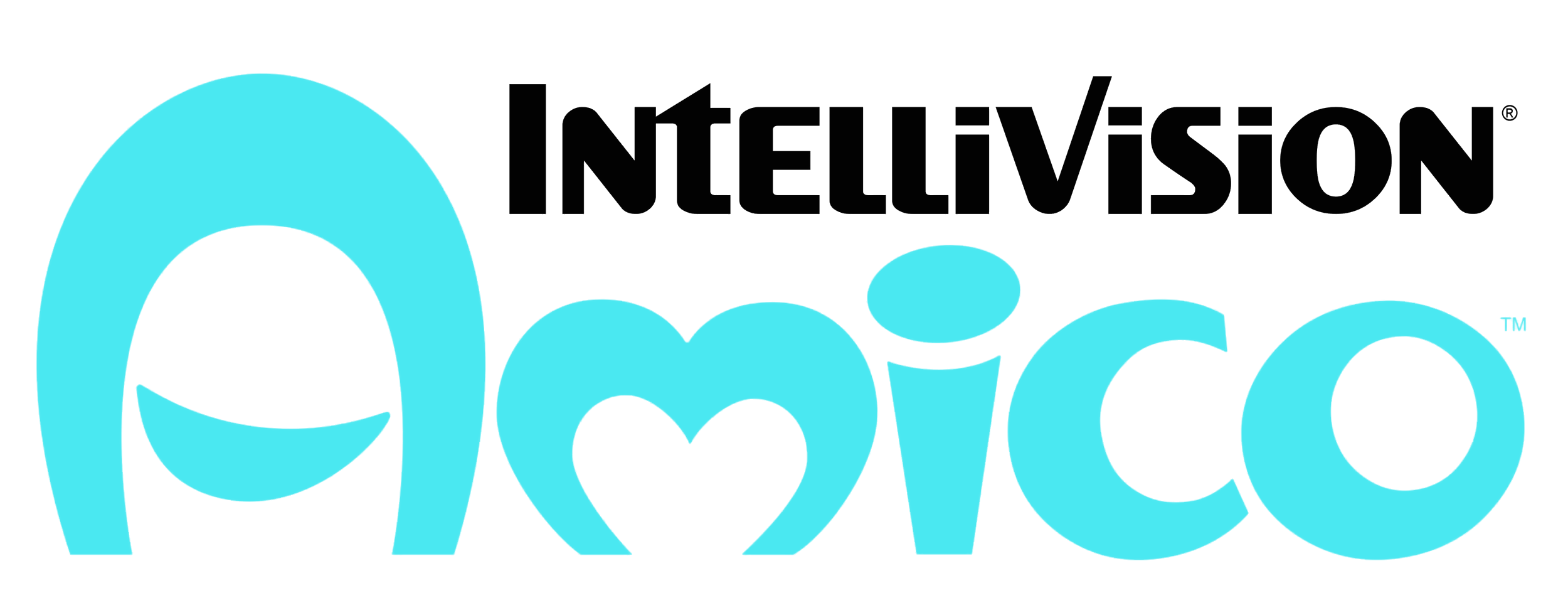

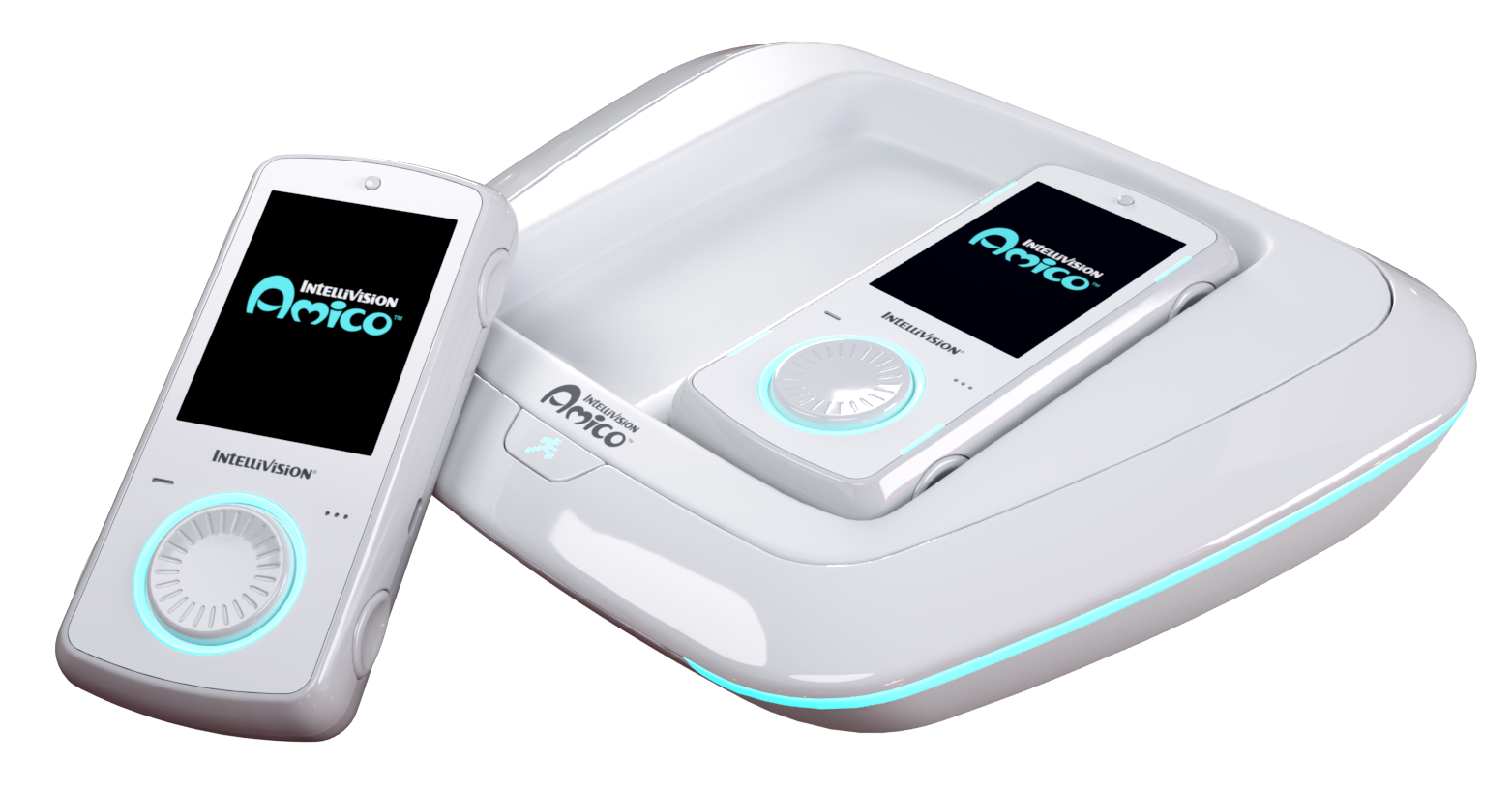
- Concept rendering
- Developer: Amico Entertainment (formerly Intellivision Entertainment)
- Manufacturer: Cal-Comp (formerly Ark Electronics)
- Type: Home video game console
- Introductory price: US$249 (Graphite Black & Glacier White); US$279 (Woodgrain); US$299 (Galaxy Purple)
- Media: Digital downloads
- Operating system: Custom Android/Linux operating system
- System on a chip: Octa-core Snapdragon 624 @ 1.8 GHz
- Memory: 2 GB RAM
- Storage: 32 GB flash memory, 1x microSD
- Display: HDMI (1080p)
- Controller input: Intellivision Amico controller, Android/iOS device, Bluetooth controller
- Connectivity: Bluetooth, Wi-Fi, RFID, wireless contact charging, 1x USB-C
- Power: 12V DC barrel plug
- Online services: Amico Game Shop
- Dimensions: 11 × 9.5 × 2.5 in (279.40 × 241.30 × 63.50 mm)
- Website: amicoentertainment.com

The Intellivision Amico (currently referred to as simply Amico) is a planned home video game console developed and marketed by Amico Entertainment (known as Intellivision Entertainment prior to Atari SA's acquisition of the Intellivision brand in May 2024). It was originally slated to be released in October 2020, but repeated delays followed, leaving the console without a release date.

The Intellivision, a home console released in 1979 that sold 3 million units, was produced by Mattel. Tommy Tallarico, a video game composer, bought a stake in the company that owned the branding for Intellivision, and then, in May 2018, announced a planned launch of a console under the Intellivision brand (which would later be named the Amico). The console was planned to target families, and it was planned to only allow family-friendly games in its library. Intellivision Entertainment was working with developers (including people who made games for the original Intellivision) to create games for the console. The Amico was to feature touchscreen controllers that dock into the console itself for charging, and could be played using an app downloaded on phones. After facing supply-chain issues because of the COVID-19 pandemic, the console's release was repeatedly delayed. Some journalists have criticized Intellivision's presentations and the console itself.

== History ==
=== Console reveal ===
In 2017, Tommy Tallarico, best known for creating the concert series Video Games Live, bought a stake in Intellivision Productions after the death of its former owner, Keith Robinson. Tallarico announced in May 2018 that he planned to relaunch the Intellivision, a home console that sold 3 million units in the early to mid-1980s, as a new, retro-branded console. Tallarico noted to Venture Beat that the target audience was "the non-gamer, the family", and that he wanted "simplicity." In December 2018, the new Intellivision Entertainment company that Tallarico had founded announced a planned October 2020 release date and revealed more proposed details about the console. The console's wireless controllers would have a touchscreen on them, and would allow smartphones to be used as controllers for games. Games would be required to have a maximum rating of E10+ on the ESRB ratings scale, meaning that games would be completely focused on targeting families. Tallarico stated that quality control for the console's games would be strict. The console would have an RFID system in it that allows for payments from credit cards to be easily processed for new game purchases and would allow easy sharing of games between consoles and friends. Tallarico announced that the company would be licensing Atari games for the console. An exclusive new Earthworm Jim game was also revealed to be in development for the console, and Intellivision Entertainment was paying a number of studios for exclusive games for the console. At this point in the development process, the console was expected to be priced between $149 and $179. At a conference in Dubai in 2019, Tallarico revealed that the company was launching a Dubai office and was planning on releasing the console at the same time in the Middle East as it was going to in the rest of the world.

=== Development stalls ===
Pre-orders were opened in April 2020, and Intellivision Entertainment revealed that it had sold over 10,000 pre-orders of its "VIP edition" of the console; it was priced at $249 for black and white versions and $279 for a woodgrain version. The console received a further $5.5 million from a campaign on crowdfunding site Fig. An October 10, 2020 release date was announced. Tallarico noted that the company had to stop taking retail purchase orders because of supply chain issues caused by the COVID-19 pandemic, and had to make development kits by hand in California instead of the planned manufacture in China. Customers were required to place a refundable $100 deposit in order to reserve the consoles. IGN Middle East's Mufaddal Fakhruddin previewed an alpha version of the console in May 2021 and felt that the games "featured sharp visuals but they would be nothing your mobile phone would not be able to handle." Fakhruddin further noted that the touchscreen software seemed somewhat laggy and unresponsive when playing the game Shark! Shark!, which according to a local representative of the company, was fixed in firmware updates for the retail builds. Fakhruddin felt that the console and its games were "fun and engaging", but "came away less than impressed with the controller", and questioned the Amico's price point at $250. In an interview with the author, Tallarico noted that he had "never experienced the slight delay issue on the controller screen menu of Shark! Shark! like you showed in your preview article", and emphasized that the console was still a work in progress.

In May 2020, it was announced former Microsoft executive and Xbox co-founder J Allard had joined Intellivision Entertainment to serve as the company's global managing director, assisting the company in launching the Amico. He left months later and said the role was "not a good fit." Despite this, Tallarico noted the hiring of Allard during an investment call in March 2021 even though Allard had already left. This led to the U.S. Securities and Exchange Commission (SEC) to send a letter for clarification to Intellivision Entertainment to clarify when Allard had left the company.

The console was delayed in August 2020 to a new release date of April 15, 2021 because of issues caused by the COVID-19 pandemic. In February 2021, Tallarico announced a further delay to October 10, 2021, because of continued supply chain issues. In early June 2021, it was revealed that Intellivision Entertainment had hired a number of the original creators of the Intellivision to remake their games for the new console. At an appearance at E3 2021, Tallarico announced a number of the games that would be coming to the console, and noted that although the pandemic had forced a delay of the console's launch, it also gave the company a chance to increase the number of games available for the console. Ars Technica's Sam Machkovech called the reaction to Tallarico's presentation a "resounding thud." The presentation showcased games that were already available as free web games, like a series of Sesame Street edutainment games. Eurogamer's Digital Foundry noted that a presentation by Intellivision Entertainment a couple of weeks later at Gamescom was extremely similar to a 2019 console reveal trailer the company had already released.

=== Added delays and new criticisms ===
In late June 2021, Ars Technica's Sam Machkovech noted a number of issues with the Amico. They noted that older presentations had shown large amounts of lag and that photos of people playing the Amico at Tallarico's E3 presentation had all been photoshopped stock photos. Machkovech accessed the internal development portal for the Amico, and noted that the hardware specs for the console appeared to be especially weak compared to other consoles in the market (and the console itself was as powerful as a budget smartphone). The portal held game-design guidelines called the "Intellivision 10 Commandments of Game-Design" and Machkovech felt that the commandments felt more like a "Game Design 101" manual instead of anything specific to the Amico. Game pricing guidance in the internal portal limited the price point to a maximum of $10 per game, with no downloadable content allowed. After publication of Machkovech's piece, Tallarico attacked him directly on Twitter, alleging that Ars Technica and Machkovech had violated copyright law by posting the article based on private development information; Tallarico later deleted the tweets and apologized. Games were later announced as costing up to $20 per game in their physical versions.

The Amico was further delayed yet again in August 2021 until the "end of the year" 2021; Intellivision said part of the problem was the global chip shortage. In September 2021, Kotaku's Zack Zwiezen noted that a number of the games being released were not exclusive games, but instead iOS and Android game ports for the console. During a 2021 fundraising call, Tallarico announced that the company would take around 50% of revenues from third-party sales, much higher than the 15–30% Apple takes from developers on its App Store.

In November 2021, it was revealed that the Amico game Tank Battle featured assets that were taken from the game World of Tanks and other third-party sources. A build of the console's operating system was released at the end of 2021, which Ars Technica's Machkovech felt had significant flaws, including combining users' owned games and store options. Machkovech and Zwiezen begun to speculate that the console would not be able to release the necessary number of devices to reach its pre-order capacity; Intellivision reported 6,000 pre-ordered units at the time. Despite the console being unreleased, a pack of four physical games was released at US$79.99 (for the collectors edition US$149.99).

In February 2022, Tallarico stepped down from his role as CEO of Intellivision, remaining on board as the company's president and largest shareholder. He was replaced by the company's former chief revenue officer Phil Adam. In a statement provided to IGN, the company said the management shift was to better align its resources to face the new challenges of commencing production of the Amico. That same month, Intellivision began its fourth round of fundraising, acknowledging that the company has had zero revenue since 2018, and would require further investment to operate beyond July 2022. A proposed total of US$10 million would allow for "7 to 9 months" operation. Though it was planned to run for three months, Intellivision Entertainment closed the campaign three weeks after its commencement. A total of US$58,001 from 54 investors was raised. Machkovech said that Intellivision's decision to close the campaign early was "... as bright and red a flag as it gets in the world of unreleased tech hardware."

In April 2022, some pre-orders of the Amico were cancelled, including some ordered via GameStop. In June, Intellivision cut staff and licensed IP, both aimed at keeping the project viable, with the company stating that it still aims to launch the console.

On July 4, 2022, publications reported that the Intellivision Amico trademark had been abandoned. On July 7, 2022, an update by Nintendo Life to its July 4 article stated that the Intellivision Amico trademark was renewed, "rather than request a further extension on the existing trademark, Intellivision has instead opted to file for a brand new one as of June 30th, 2022."

In November 2023, Intellivision said that it had insufficient funds needed to finance the production of the console units. To secure finances, a mobile application titled Amico Home was launched, allowing for gameplay of select Amico titles on Android and iOS.

In May 2024 Atari SA announced their purchase of the Intellivision brand and its assets. The Amico was not included in the sale and would be renamed, although Atari would license the Intellivision library back to the company for release on the console. After this transaction, the former Intellivision company renamed itself to Amico Entertainment, and began phasing out any Intellivision branding.

== Hardware ==
=== Console ===
The console is based on an 8-core 1.8 GHz Qualcomm Snapdragon 624 system on a chip with an Adreno 506 GPU. The system supports Bluetooth, Wi-Fi, RFID, HDMI out, a microSD card slot, a charging cradle for two Amico controllers on the top, passive cooling, and one USB-C port on the back for accessories and expansions. The body also features a built-in LED ambient lighting system with 40 independently controlled LEDs that can change pattern and color in response to gameplay, known as Interactive Guidance Lighting. The console will launch with five available colors: Glacier White, Graphite Black, Vintage Woodgrain, Galaxy Purple and GTO Red. The system has 32 GB of internal memory storage, and utilizes a custom Android/Linux operating system customized in-house.

=== Controller ===
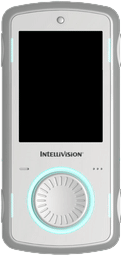
Concept rendering of the Intellivision Amico controller

The system comes with two controllers, designed to be ambidextrous for right- or left-handed preference. The controllers charge in the cradle on top of the console, or via a wired USB-C connection. They charge in 2 hours, and can run for 4–6 hours on a full charge. They feature Bluetooth, speakers, a microphone, an accelerometer, gyroscope, and haptic force feedback. They also feature a 3.2 in (81.28 mm) color capacitive touch screen, a home button and a 64-way pressure-sensitive directional disc. Four oversized buttons are placed as two shoulder buttons each for right handed or left handed orientation. Each shoulder button features an LED light, and the disc is surrounded by a ring of eight LEDs. These LEDs, in addition to the LEDs on the console, have brightness settings, or can be turned off. The controllers come with wrist straps to prevent them from flying away during game action if not held securely. Two additional Amico controllers can be connected, and mobile devices emulating Amico controllers, using a free smartphone app, can connect through WiFi for a total of eight connected controllers.

Developer information obtained by Ars Technica showed that the controller's touchscreen would operate at a framerate of "15–30+" frames per second, and any given game's content on the controller would be coded in SparkAce, an HTML/CSS hybrid with support for the PNG8 and Ogg Vorbis formats, and fit within 1 MB, which the document said was intended to reduce transfer times between the controller and console. Published specifications list the controller memory as 8 MB RAM and 32 MB flash.

=== Accessories ===
Announced accessories include a bag to hold the console, a sleeve to protect the controller and ten themed packs of three controller skins.

== Games ==
According to Tallarico, all games for the Amico would have been both single player and multiplayer, with local cooperative play. Six games were expected to have come included with the Amico, and more than 20 additional games announced to be available at launch. Five of the six included games were announced to have been Skiing, Astrosmash, Shark! Shark!, Cornhole, and Farkle, with the sixth game being a party game. Digitally downloaded games were to be priced at $9.99 (€8.49) or less, while physical copies of games were to have been available at retail for US$19.99 (€17.99). In July 2021, the first 50,000 run of physical game products for both Europe and North America were manufactured but did not contain actual games.

Title	Developer	Ref.
10-Yard Fight		
ACL Cornhole		
Archon	React Games	
Asteroids		
Astrosmash	Rogue Rocket Games	
B-17 Bomber		
Back Talk Party		
Bad Dudes		
Baseball		
Beauty and the Beast		
Biplanes	WastedStudios	
Blank Slate		
Bomb Squad	International Headquarters	
Bowling		
Boxing		
Brain Duel	BBG Entertainment	
Breakout	Choice Provisions	
Bump 'n' Jump		
Caveman Ninja		
Care Bears Care Karts	PlayDate Digital	
Cloudy Mountain	Other Ocean	
Darts		
Demon Attack		
Dolphin Quest	Playchemy	
Dracula		
Dragonfire		
Dynablaster	BBG Entertainment	
Earthworm Jim 4	Intellivision Entertainment	
Emoji Charades	GameCake	
Evel Knievel	Barnstorm Games	
Farkle	Spaceflower	
Finnigan Fox	Bonus Level Entertainment	
Flying Tigers		
Frog Bog		
Horse Racing		
Hot Wheels Colossal Crash		
Ice Trek		
Incan Gold / Diamont		
Jungle Hunt		
Kung-Fu Master		
Liar's Dice	The Bitmap Brothers	
Lode Runner	Tozai Games	
Math Fun		
Miner 2049er		
Missile Command	Stainless Games	
MLB Baseball		
Moon Patrol: The Milky Way Chronicles	WastedStudios	
MotoRace USA		
Night Driver		
Night Stalker	Other Ocean	
Nitro Derby	Chicken Waffle	
Pong	Way Digital Studios	
Pool	Pool Legends IVS	
R-Type		
Rigid Force Redux Enhanced	com8com1, Headup	
Sesame Street games		
Shark! Shark!	Neobird, Bonus Level Entertainment	
Skiing	Aesir Interactive	
Snafoo	Thera Bytes	
Space Strikers	Couch in the Woods Interactive	
Spades	Concrete Software	
Spelunker		
Soccer		
Super BurgerTime		
Tank Battle	Lost Mesa Entertainment	
Telestrations		
Tempest		
ToeJam & Earl		
Tron Deadly Discs	Other Ocean	
Tropical Angel		
Utopia		
Warlords	Stainless Games	
Yar's Revenge		
