= Shotgun (funk band) =

American funk band

Shotgun were an American funk band from Detroit, Michigan, that recorded six albums between 1977 and 1982. They also had eight hit records on the Billboard R&B chart, the most successful being "Don't You Wanna Make Love" which reached #35 on the R&B chart in 1979. The band was formed by 24-Carat Black band members William Talbert, Tyrone Steels, Ernest Lattimore and Gregory Ingram.

Of the band's 1977 debut album Shotgun, Dusty Groove said, "This first album by Shotgun — one of the many major label funk groups who flourished briefly at the end of the 70s has a harder sound than most of this nature — with plenty of guitars in the mix, and an overall heavier sound than you'd expect from an effort of this type. In fact, there's almost a rock/funk kind of groove going on — one that would be more typical of early 70s crossover efforts on Epic, in the wake of Sly Stone and other artists like that."

== Members ==
- Richard Sebastian (trumpet)
- Greg Ingram (saxophone)
- Billy Talbert (keyboards, guitars)
- Ernest Latimore (guitars, vocals)
- Larry Austin (bass)
- Tyrone Steels (drums, vocals)
- Leslie Carter (percussion)
- Robert Resch (drums)

== Discography ==
- Shotgun (ABC 1977)
- Good, Bad & Funky (ABC 1978)
- Shotgun III (ABC 1979)
- Shotgun IV (MCA 1980)
- Kingdom Come (MCA 1980)
- Ladies Choice (Montage 1982)

== See also ==
- List of funk rock bands
