= Ladies' Choice (TV series) =

American TV variety series (1953)

- Genre: Variety
- Written by: Cal Howard; Henry Taylor
- Directed by: John Lyman
- Presented by: Johnny Dugan
- Country of origin: United States

Production
- Producers: Burt Harris; Edward Sobol

Original release
- Network: NBC
- Release: June 8 – September 25, 1953

Ladies' Choice is an American daytime variety television program that was broadcast on NBC from June 8, 1953, through September 25, 1953.

== Format ==
Johnny Dugan was the host of the series, which had women's organizations select the artists who performed as guests. Some performers were winners of local talent shows, and some were provided by female talent scouts. Performers came from around the United States and ranged in age from juveniles to grandmothers. For most, the appearance was their first public performance outside their home areas.

Using an approach similar to that of Arthur Godfrey's Talent Scouts, Dugan interviewed female guests, and the guests then introduced the entertainers that they had brought to the program. Applause from the studio audience determined the winning act in each episode, with that person receiving prizes and opportunities to perform professionally. The winner returned the next day to compete with two new acts. The show's music director, Vic Valente, directed a quintet. Episodes included elements unrelated to the entertainers — "Grandmother of the Day" recognition and a contest that had viewers trying to identify a spinning picture.

Viewers were asked to vote on whether performers should make return visits to the show. In the program's premiere week 11,007 letters were submitted; 19,473 came in its second week on the air, and 23,195 arrived the following week. During the first three weeks of July 1953, viewers sent 69,390 letters.

== Production ==
Ladies' Choice was a summer replacement for half of the Kate Smith Hour, with Time Out for Fun starring Fran Allison filling the other 30 minutes. Jerry Layton and Wilbur Stark were the packagers of Ladies' Choice. Burt Harris and Edward Sobol were the producers, and John Lyman was the director. Cal Howard and Henry Taylor were the writers, and Lillian Greene was the women's clubs coordinator. The program was sustaining, but in September 1953, the trade publication Billboard reported, "Sales effort on the show, which drew an 8.3 Nielsen, is being intensified."

The program originated from KNBH in Hollywood, while Layton and Stark worked from New York City. Stark said that they initially sought a host in New York, but they eventually decided that Dugan was the best person for the job. His family's preference for living in the west kept him there, while Layton's and Stark's business obligations kept them in New York City. Setting up a direct telephone line from their office to the studio from which Ladies' Choice was broadcast enabled them to work in real time with each broadcast. Layton and Stark watched the show live on a TV set in their office while an assistant stayed on the phone in the studio waiting to relay any instructions they might have to the director. Stark commented that the unusual setup offered an advantage over the normal procedure of working in the studio: "Seeing the show on a receiver, just as the audience does ... gives us an objectivity we couldn't get otherwise. We don't have any of the usual studio distractions."

== Critical response ==
Writing in the San Mateo Times Bob Foster called the mix of elements on the show a "hodgepodge". He wrote, "NBC has come up with a show that finds the guest talent far more entertaining than the regulars on the show", and later he added about Dugan, "the guy just can't sing".

A review in the trade publication Variety said, "Here's one talent show where the guest talent is better than the program's regulars." It added that Dugan should sing less and explained, "Quality of his voice isn't bad, but he's obviously in need of some training in all phases of delivery."
