= Earthworm Jim 3D =

1999 video game

- North American N64 box art
- Developer: VIS Interactive
- Publishers: Nintendo 64: NA: Rockstar Games; PAL: Interplay Entertainment; Windows: WW: Interplay Entertainment
- Director: Kirk Ewing
- Artist: Paul Munro
- Composer: Ged Grimes
- Series: Earthworm Jim
- Platforms: Nintendo 64; Windows
- Release: Nintendo 64: NA: November 4, 1999; EU: December 17, 1999; Windows: EU: 1999; NA: May 24, 2000
- Genres: Platform, action-adventure
- Mode: Single-player

Earthworm Jim 3D is a 1999 platform game developed by VIS Interactive and published by Interplay Entertainment for the Nintendo 64. It is the third game in the Earthworm Jim series and a sequel to Earthworm Jim 2. It was the first game in the series to not be developed by Shiny Entertainment, which had recently instituted a strict "no sequels" policy. Interplay Entertainment, having recently purchased the rights to the Earthworm Jim franchise, handed them off to VIS Interactive.

The game suffered a difficult, prolonged development cycle and was repeatedly delayed until it was released in 1999 for the Nintendo 64, with Rockstar Games publishing the N64 version in North America. It was ported to Microsoft Windows. The game was not received well, with critics claiming that the charm of the originals was lost, and that despite the long development period, the game still felt sloppy and lacked previously promoted features.

== Gameplay ==
Earthworm Jim 3D borrows much of its gameplay from other platformers of the era, competing with Banjo-Kazooie and Donkey Kong 64. New locations in Jim's brain are opened up by collecting Golden Udders, and new levels in each location are opened by collecting Jim's marbles. Like previous Earthworm Jim games, Jim's primary method of combat comes from shooting his blaster.

== Plot ==
Earthworm Jim is hit by a flying cow that sends him into a coma. Jim awakens within his own subconscious and discovers he has gone insane. His past villains have entered his subconscious and if something does not happen soon, Jim will become stuck in the coma forever. His super ego has been unleashed within his subconscious to stop the madness. To restore his sanity he must find the Golden Udders of Lucidity. When Jim enters his subconscious, he finds out that his four mind chambers have been taken over by his worst fears. He must collect Golden Udders to unlock the other three chambers and Green Marbles to unlock the levels within the chamber. Jim defeats four villains who took over his mind chambers, and finally faces the personification of his trauma: Earthworm Kim.

== Development ==
Shortly after the release of Earthworm Jim 2, its original developer, Shiny Entertainment was bought by Interplay Entertainment, and then put onto other projects. Because Shiny had recently introduced a strict "no sequels" policy, the franchise was given to VIS Entertainment. It was decided that, much like many platform game series at the time, such as Super Mario or Sonic the Hedgehog, that gameplay would transition from 2D to 3D. Development started shortly after Earthworm Jim 2 in 1996. The game had a drawn-out development cycle, so much so that it was at times believed it would become vaporware. The game was initially being developed for the PlayStation, but this version was scrapped early in 1997 in favor of the Nintendo 64 platform.

Problems arose from the extended development cycle. Much of the content shown in previews and promotional material was nowhere to be seen in the final game: most notably, the game's final packaging showed Evil the Cat as the boss of the "Fear" level, whereas Professor Monkey-for-a-Head was actually the boss. Many locations displayed in early versions of the game are nowhere to be found in the released copy (such as a level set in a house, where Jim is ant-sized). Additionally, Evil Jim, Earthworm Jim's evil twin from the cartoon series, was reportedly a part of the game. Early screenshots and footage also display Jim riding his Pocket Rocket, with a fuel meter, in races and other missions, as well as snowboarding. Additionally, the game was loosely based on the Earthworm Jim animated series which by the time of release, had been off the air for more than three years, thus hurting the game's promotional tie-ins.

At the time, original series designer David Perry had sold the rights to the franchise. The characters had to be redesigned for the shift from side-scrolling 2D to free-roaming 3D. Perry and original series creator Doug TenNapel met with VIS to discuss the game early in its development. Both expressed that they hated what was done with Earthworm Jim 3D, but legally could not prevent anything from happening. TenNapel said he felt the series was "ruined" by the game.

Problems with the frame rate and animation were still arising in the game as development was over 70% complete.

== Reception ==
Reception

Aggregate score
Aggregator	Score	
Aggregator	N64	PC
GameRankings	59%	56%

Review scores
Publication	Score	
Publication	N64	PC
AllGame	2.5/5	2/5
CNET Gamecenter	6/10	3/10
Electronic Gaming Monthly	5/10 (Note: In Electronic Gaming Monthly's review of the Nintendo 64 version, one critic gave it 3/10, two others gave it each a score of 5.5/10, and another gave it 6/10.)	N/A
Game Informer	5.75/10	N/A
GameFan	(G.N.) 78% 61% (Note: In GameFan's viewpoint of the Nintendo 64 version, three critics gave it each a score of 64, 66, and 54.)	N/A
GameSpot	6.3/10	3.2/10
GameSpy	N/A	75%
Hyper	67%	N/A
IGN	7.3/10	6/10
N64 Magazine	68%	N/A
Next Generation	1/5	N/A
Nintendo Power	6.8/10	N/A
PC Gamer (UK)	N/A	45%

Earthworm Jim 3D received mixed reviews on both platforms according to the review aggregation website GameRankings.

The game was not considered either a critical or commercial success. Many reviews called the game uninspired, mediocre, and unable to compete with many other similar, higher reviewed platform games at the time, such as Super Mario 64, Rayman 2, or Banjo-Kazooie. A major complaint was the game's camera, with GameSpot's Nintendo 64 version review stating that they felt the camera was on a "kamikaze mission to destroy the game". GameSpot's review of the Windows version was even more negative, concluding with "Earthworm Jim 3D has something to discourage all types of people from playing it. Fans of the series will be disappointed by the lackluster translation of the characters into three dimensions. Everyone else will be frustrated by the horrible camera." IGN was slightly more forgiving for the Nintendo 64 version, praising sound, graphics, and presentation, but still criticizing the camera and lasting appeal. Jeff Lundrigan of NextGen said that the music of the same console version was "annoying".

In one review, Boba Fatt of GamePro called the Nintendo 64 version "a disappointing experience that's more enraging than fun. Avoid this washout at all costs." (Note: GamePro gave the Nintendo 64 version 3/5 for graphics, 3.5/5 for sound, 1/5 for control, and 2.5/5 for fun factor in one review.) In another review, iBot said, "Earthworm Jim's crazy antics have made it to N64, but it appears that the system wasn't ready for him. As 3D platformers go, Earthworm Jim 3D is middle of the road, which is frustrating because he's a character that's a lot of fun." (Note: GamePro gave the Nintendo 64 version two 3.5/5 scores for graphics and sound, 2/5 for control, and 3/5 for fun factor in another review.)

The PC version was nominated for the "Worst Game of the Year" award at GameSpot's Best and Worst of 2000 Awards, which went to Blaze and Blade: Eternal Quest.
