= Earthworm Jim: Menace 2 the Galaxy =

1999 video game

- North American box art
- Developer: David A. Palmer Productions
- Publisher: Crave Entertainment
- Designers: Ike Melton; Nima Taghavi
- Composer: Mark Cooksey
- Series: Earthworm Jim
- Platform: Game Boy Color
- Release: NA: November 11, 1999; UK: December 1999
- Genre: Platform
- Mode: Single-player

Earthworm Jim: Menace 2 the Galaxy is a 1999 platform video game developed by David A. Palmer Productions and published by Crave Entertainment for the Game Boy Color. It is the fourth and final installment in the Earthworm Jim series. The game received mixed reviews, with critics considering it inferior to the first two games in the series.

== Gameplay ==
Earthworm Jim's evil doppelgänger, Evil Jim, has stolen an interdimensional teleporter and is causing a rampage through the galaxy. Jim must embark on yet another adventure to stop him. The game plays as a 2D sidescrolling platformer with run and gun elements, similar to the original games. However, the game is much more centralized towards exploring levels to collect items, rather than the constantly changing gimmicks present in the original two games. Levels typically involve goals such as collecting 100 or more coins to progress, and if Jim takes too much damage, the player must start the level over again, without any items collected.

The game retains some features from past games. Four different guns can be collected and used to defeat enemies: the standard gun, plasma gun, machine gun, and a rocket launcher. An early preview of the game posted by IGN listed a grenade launcher instead of a machine gun as the fourth weapon in the game, perhaps indicating that this was changed later in development. The player can also find Jim's friend, Snott, and ride him to jump higher, or obtain Jim's rocket, which allows Jim to fly and shoot across the level for a small amount of time.

After every two levels, Jim faces a boss fight including characters from past games and the Earthworm Jim television series, which include Bob the Killer Goldfish, Evil the Cat and Henchrat, Queen Slug-for-a-Butt and Evil Jim.

The game is compatible with both the Game Boy and Game Boy Color video game consoles. However, the level named "Happiness" is only available if the game is played on the Game Boy Color, being playable upon the game's completion.

== Reception ==
The game received generally negative reception, with reviewers criticizing the game's inability to capture the fun gameplay found in the original two games in the series. IGN gave the game a 6 out of 10, criticizing the game's tedious collecting of items as "quite frustrating" and complaining that the game has "total disregard to what makes Earthworm Jim, Earthworm Jim...There's not enough 'cleverness' here, the same element that made Earthworm Jim one of the best and funniest action games on the 16-bit systems." Nintendo Power gave the game a similar 6.3 out of 10. AllGame also criticized the tedious collecting, stating "Unfortunately, I found each search to be more of a chore than a form of entertainment" and the fact that Jim no longer had a "whip" attack like prior games in the series. They concluded that the game was "marginally interesting when it came time to advance to a new level or battle a major enemy, but tiresome more often than not".
