= Earthworm Jim (TV series) =

American-British animated television series

- A screenshot from the series' opening sequence showcasing its logo next to the protagonists.
- Genre: Action/Adventure; Superhero; Science fiction comedy Slapstick
- Created by: Doug TenNapel
- Based on: Earthworm Jim by Doug TenNapel and Shiny Entertainment
- Developed by: Doug Langdale
- Directed by: Ginny McSwain (voice director)
- Voices of: Dan Castellaneta; Jeff Bennett; Charlie Adler; Jim Cummings; Edward Hibbert; John Kassir; Andrea Martin; Kath Soucie
- Narrated by: Jeff Bennett
- Theme music composer: William Anderson
- Opening theme: "Earthworm Jim", performed by William Anderson, Jeff Bennett and Dan Castellaneta
- Ending theme: "Earthworm Jim" (instrumental)
- Composers: William Anderson; Patrick Griffin
- Countries of origin: United States; United Kingdom
- Original language: English
- No. of seasons: 2
- No. of episodes: 23

Production
- Executive producers: David Perry; Doug TenNapel
- Producers: Kathi Castillo; Roy Allen Smith
- Editor: Jay Bixsen
- Running time: 25 minutes
- Production companies: Universal Cartoon Studios (Note: Animation outsourced to AKOM.); Flextech Plc

Original release
- Network: The WB (Kids' WB) (United States); TCC (United Kingdom)
- Release: September 9, 1995 – December 13, 1996

Earthworm Jim is an animated television series based on the video game series of the same name and created by series creator Doug TenNapel that aired on The WB's Kids' WB block for two seasons from September 9, 1995, to December 13, 1996. A co-production between Universal Cartoon Studios and Flextech Plc, the series follows the adventures of the titular character who battles the forces of evil through the use of a robotic suit.

== Premise ==
Most episodes involve the series' numerous villains attempting to reclaim the super suit or conquer the universe. However, some episodes have Jim facing more mundane issues, which include returning his neighbor's eggbeater and finding a new power source after his suit's battery runs out. The series breaks the fourth wall with characters often talking to the audience and the narrator, and in the second season, some plots involve the characters' awareness of existing in a TV show and multiple mentions are made of Universal Cartoon Studios.

Episodes begin with a cold opening of Jim and Peter Puppy in some peril that has nothing to do with the main plot or the past episodes, with little statement of how they got into the mess. In between parts (generally before or after the commercial break), there is a short side-story, generally featuring one of the villains doing a more natural part of life, usually without any involvement from Jim. Both of these are changed in the second season, with the cold opens being more relevant to the plot and the side stories being dropped entirely. Most episodes end with a character being crushed by a falling cow, an homage to the original game's ending.

== Characters ==
Most of the main characters from the show originated from characters introduced in the video game series. Peter Puppy becomes Jim's sidekick and friend and Princess What's-Her-Name is featured as his love interest. Several antagonists from the games such as Evil the Cat, Psy-Crow, Bob the Killer Goldfish, Queen Slug-for-a-Butt, and Professor Monkey-for-a-Head also appear in the series.

Additionally, some original characters were also created for the series before being integrated into future games in the series. These include Evil Jim and Evil the Cat's servant Henchrat, the former being the main antagonist in Earthworm Jim: Menace 2 the Galaxy.

== Voice cast ==
The voice director for the series was Ginny McSwain.

=== Main ===
- Dan Castellaneta as Earthworm Jim, Evil Jim, Jim's brains, Turns-His-Eyelids-Inside-Out Boy, The Grim Reaper, Jaepius (in "Assault and Battery"), Abraham Lincoln (in "Sword of Righteousness")
- Jeff Bennett as Peter Puppy, The Narrator, The Hamsternator, The President of the United States, The Puce Dynamo, The Great Worm Spirit (in "The Anti-Fish"), Evil Peter (in "Opposites Attack!")
- Charlie Adler as Professor Monkey-for-a-Head, The Doorman of the Gods (in "Assault and Battery"), Rudolph the Red-Nosed Reindeer (in "For Whom the Jingle Bell Tolls")
- Jim Cummings as Psy-Crow, Bob the Killer Goldfish, Whooping Cough Boy, Zantor, Walter, The Sword of Righteousness, Maggot, Cuban Band Leader, Evil Cow, Lower Back Pain Man, Johnny Dactyl and Phlegmaphus (in "Assault and Battery"), The Giant Fur-Bearing Trout (in "The Anti-Fish"), Santa Claus (in "For Whom the Jingle Bell Tolls")
- Edward Hibbert as Evil the Cat
- John Kassir as Snott, Henchrat, Grayson (in "Upholstered Peril")
- Andrea Martin as Queen Slug-for-a-Butt, Torch Singer
- Kath Soucie as Princess What's-Her-Name, Evil Princess (in "Opposites Attack!"), Johnny Dactyl's mother (in "The Exile of Lucy"), Perpsichore (in "Assault and Battery"), Cody (in "Peanut of the Apes")

=== Additional ===
- Gregg Berger as various (Season 1)
- S. Scott Bullock as various (Season 1)
- Miriam Flynn as Malice the Dog (in "Evil in Love")
- Brad Garrett as The Lord of Nightmares (in "Evil in Love")
- Lisa Kaplan as various (Season 2)
- Danny Mann as Archbug (in "Queen What's-Her-Name", "For Whom the Jingle Bell Tolls")
- Edie McClurg as various (Season 1)
- Dee Dee Rescher as Galamour the Destroyer (in "The Great Secret of the Universe")
- Kevin Michael Richardson as the Anti-Fish (in "The Anti-Fish")
- Roger Rose as various (Season 1)
- Ben Stein as Rosebud the Nameless Beast (in "The Great Secret of the Universe"), Dr. Houston (in "The Origin of Peter Puppy")
- Billy West as Morty, Surgeon (in "Lounge Day's Journey into Night")
- April Winchell as Mrs. Bleverage, Ilene (in "Lounge Day's Journey into Night")

== Production ==
In 1995, Doug TenNapel and Will Meugniot created a pitch animation video for WB, in which TenNapel voiced Jim. On August 23, 2022, YouTube user gooberloll uploaded the pitch video. However, Meugniot was not a producer for the final series, having left to work on X-Men: The Animated Series. Before Dan Castellaneta was cast as Jim, Matt Frewer was originally going to voice him.

== Episodes ==
Two seasons of the series were produced, for a total of 23 episodes.

=== Series overview ===
Season	Episodes	Originally aired	
Season	Episodes	First aired	Last aired
1	13	September 9, 1995	February 24, 1996
2	10	September 7, 1996	December 13, 1996

=== Season 1 (1995–96) ===
No. overall	No. in season	Title	Written by	Original release date
1	1	"Sidekicked"	Doug Langdale	September 9, 1995
Queen Slug-for-a-Butt locates Princess What's-Her-Name on Earth. Reasoning that Jim is fond of the princess, the Queen has Psy-Crow kidnap her and hold her for ransom, intending for Jim to give up his suit in exchange for her safety. Meanwhile, Jim grows tired of Peter's transformations hindering him and enlists numerous replacement sidekicks. Peter is left at home while Jim heads off to rescue the princess. Undeterred, Peter stows away in Jim's rocket and helps him defeat Psy-Crow. The two discover that the Princess escaped on her own.: Villains mentioned: Professor Monkey-for-a-Head, Psy-Crow, Queen Slug-for-a-Butt, Evil the Cat
2	2	"The Book of Doom"	Doug Langdale	September 16, 1995
Evil the Cat steals Jim's animal pop-up book, which contains instructions for how to destroy the universe due to a printing error made in ancient times. Learning that he must make all the Reeking Beasts of the Malodoron System see a fondue fork at once, Evil travels there to execute his plan. Jim confronts Evil, with Evil's hologram projector accidentally being activated in the ensuing battle. However, the universe is saved because one of the Beasts is nearsighted, leaving her unable to see the fork. Jim and Peter destroy Evil's ship, stranding him and Henchrat on the planet. Jim and Peter also go inside of Psycrow in the cold opening.: Villains mentioned: Psy-Crow, Professor Monkey-for-a-Head, Evil the Cat, Henchrat
3	3	"Assault and Battery"	Thomas Hart	September 23, 1995
Due to overuse, Jim's suit begins to run out of power, limiting his movement. After learning that it is powered by a GODS battery, Jim and Peter travel to the home of the gods to get a replacement, while Queen Slug-for-a-Butt threatens to destroy Terlawk if Jim does not give up his suit. After negotiating with several lesser-known gods and getting the battery, Jim defeats the Queen by throwing her into space.: Villains mentioned: Professor Monkey-for-a-Head, Queen Slug-for-a-Butt, Psy-Crow, Evil the Cat, Henchrat
4	4	"Day of the Fish"	Doug Langdale	September 30, 1995
As Jim plays poker with other heroes, he learns that they have run out of sugar and heads to the nearest planet to get some. However, this planet is La Planeta de Agua (Arriba!), home of Bob the Killer Goldfish, who confronts Jim with his feline henchmen. Jim manages to defeat them, but realizes that he never got the sugar and ventures out again in search of it.: Villains mentioned: Queen Slug-for-a-Butt, Bob the Killer Goldfish, Number Four, Number Five, Number Six, Number Seven, Evil the Cat, Henchrat
5	5	"Conqueror Worm"	Doug Langdale	October 7, 1995
While visiting the mall with Peter and the Hamsternator, Jim accidentally takes a photo of himself that is discarded in a landfill, exposed to toxic waste, and transformed into an evil clone of Jim. Believing Evil Jim to be a split personality and himself to be responsible for his crimes, Jim gives up his suit and is willingly imprisoned, where he befriends fellow inmate Walter. However, he escapes and defeats Evil Jim after learning the truth.: Villains mentioned: Evil the Cat, Henchrat, Evil Jim, Bob the Killer Goldfish, Number Four
6	6	"Upholstered Peril"	John Loy	October 14, 1995
Mysterious living furniture with hypnotic powers appear around the world. After Peter is incapacitated by one, Jim enlists the help of Grayson, a teenaged prodigy and head of his fan club, who discovers that the furniture are created and remotely controlled by Professor Monkey-for-a-Head. Jim defeats the Professor by throwing his rocket at his tank, triggering a switch that flings him far away.: Villains mentioned: Bob the Killer Goldfish, Number Four, Psy-Crow, Professor Monkey-for-a-Head, Queen-Slug-For-A-Butt, Evil the Cat, Henchrat
7	7	"Sword of Righteousness"	Steve Roberts	October 21, 1995
Jim finds an ancient enchanted sword embedded in a sandwich he bought who trains him to be a more powerful hero. However, while fighting Psy-Crow, Jim realizes that the sword has been manipulating him into following its ideas of heroism, learns that it has never won a fight, and abandons it to defeat Psy-Crow on his own. Jim accidentally sits on Psy-Crow's Orb of Quite Remarkable Power, freeing an ancient energy being who leaves to bring peace to the universe.: Villains mentioned: Evil the Cat, Psy-Crow, Professor Monkey-for-a-Head
8	8	"The Egg Beater"	Jim Peterson, John Behnke, Rob Humphrey	October 28, 1995
After losing his neighbor Ethel Bleverage's egg beater during a battle with Bob, Jim is distraught and takes her and Peter across the universe to recover it, encountering numerous villains in the process. After defeating them, Jim finds the egg beater, but discovers that it is the wrong one and that he had the actual egg beater in his pocket all along.: Villains mentioned: Bob the Killer Goldfish, Number Four, Evil the Cat, Henchrat, Professor Monkey-for-a-Head, Queen Slug-for-a-Butt, Psy-Crow
9	9	"Trout!"	Henry Gilroy	November 4, 1995
After receiving a postcard from Peter's uncle Rex, Jim learns of the legendary Giant Fur-Bearin' Trout and sets out on a road trip to find it. Meanwhile, Professor Monkey-for-a-Head develops a banana-like weapon for Queen Slug-for-a-Butt that is powered by fish hair, leading her to go to Earth in search of the Trout. After the Queen kidnaps Princess What's-Her-Name, Jim races to locate the Trout and ultimately defeats the Queen by destroying her staff.: Villains mentioned: Psy-Crow, Professor Monkey-for-a-Head, Queen Slug-for-a-Butt, Evil the Cat
10	10	"The Great Secret of the Universe"	Doug Langdale	November 11, 1995
Evil the Cat steals Jim's snow globe, summoning Rosebud the Nameless Beast to destroy the universe by breaking its glass barrier. Rosebud proves to be peaceful and leaves Evil's service, but accidentally breaks the barrier while throwing away the key that Evil was controlling him with. Jim and Peter seal the hole, trapping Evil and Henchrat outside of the universe. Later, Rosebud realizes that he likes taking orders and becomes a waiter.: Villains mentioned: Professor Monkey-for-a-Head, Evil the Cat, Henchrat, Bob the Killer Goldfish, Number Four
11	11	"Bring Me the Head of Earthworm Jim"	Doug Langdale	November 18, 1995
Psy-Crow and Professor Monkey-for-a-Head have captured Jim and Peter and put them on display on their wall. A flashback reveals that they did so after tricking Jim into giving them his suit and replacing it with a powerless replica, with Jim trying several methods to get his powers back before being captured. In the present, Peter escapes and frees Jim after disguising himself as a taxidermist.: Villains mentioned: Queen Slug-for-a-Butt, Evil the Cat, Professor Monkey-for-a-Head, Psy-Crow
12	12	"Queen What's-Her-Name"	Doug Langdale	November 25, 1995
Jim and Princess What's-Her-Name manage to overthrow and imprison Queen Slug-for-a-Butt. However, she plots revenge and rigs the Princess's dress so that it will cause her to uncontrollably attack others during the coronation ceremony. The Princess destroys the dress and decides to convert Insectika into an electoral democracy. However, this enables the Queen to take back leadership as nobody ran against her.: Villains mentioned: Evil the Cat, Queen Slug-for-a-Butt, Psy-Crow, Professor Monkey-for-a-Head
13	13	"The Anti-Fish"	Doug Langdale	February 24, 1996
Bob awakens the Anti-Fish, a cosmic entity and enemy of the Great Worm Spirit, but is unable to control it. Bob is forced to work with Jim and Peter to stop the Fish from traveling back in time and killing the Spirit at the beginning of the universe. Jim sacrifices himself to self-destruct his suit and destroy the Fish from within, but the Spirit revives him out of gratitude.: Villains mentioned: Psy-Crow, Bob the Killer Goldfish, Number Four, The Anti-Fish, Evil Jim, Professor Monkey-for-a-Head

=== Season 2 (1996) ===
No. overall	No. in season	Title	Written by	Original release date
14	1	"The Origins of Peter Puppy"	Doug Langdale	September 7, 1996
After becoming fed up with Peter's transformations, Jim sets out to discover his origins. He learns that Peter was originally a normal dog who willingly approached a vacuum cleaner to prove himself and was transported to Heck. There, he was possessed by one of Evil's demon servants as punishment. This inflicted Peter with his transformation while making him anthropomorphic and capable of speech. After being bullied and wandering Earth for a year, Peter encountered Jim, who defeats him and considers arresting at first, but reconsiders and makes Peter his sidekick instead. After Jim gets Evil to exorcise Peter, he is returned to his normal form, with the demon being imprisoned in a bottle. Jim and Peter attempt to escape Heck, but are captured by Evil. Despite having lost his sapience, Peter recognizes that Jim is in danger and shatters the bottle, allowing the demon to possess him once more. Peter transforms and mauls Evil, enabling him and Jim to escape Heck.: Villains mentioned: Evil the Cat, Henchrat
15	2	"Opposites Attack!"	Doug Langdale	September 14, 1996
Having become lonely due to being the only evil twin in the universe, Evil Jim creates a ray gun that can create evil duplicates of whatever it hits. However, the clones of Peter and Princess What's-Her-Name have undesirable traits that make them less useful to him: Peter's monster form is benevolent while the Princess is too obsessed with fashion to fight. Jim defeats Evil Jim by shooting him with his own gun, creating numerous good clones of Jim that help defeat him.: Villains mentioned: Evil Jim, Evil Princess, Evil Peter, Queen Slug-for-a-Butt, Professor Monkey-for-a-Head, Evil the Cat
16	3	"Darwin's Nightmare"	Doug Langdale	September 28, 1996
Angered by the limitations of his fish body, Bob creates a device that drains evolutionary energy from others to evolve himself. Becoming a human with psychic powers, he takes over the world while Jim and Peter are devolved and become too dumb to fight him. Princess What's-Her-Name, who has been devolved into a small insect-like form, helps Jim and Peter destroy Bob's device, returning everyone affected by it to normal.: Villains mentioned: Bob the Killer Goldfish, Number Four
17	4	"The Exile of Lucy"	Doug Langdale	October 5, 1996
Psy-Crow and Professor Monkey-for-a-Head overthrow Queen Slug-for-a-Butt and exile her to Earth, where she befriends Jim's neighbor Ethel and settles into a domestic life. However, Jim and Princess What's-Her-Name realize that the Queen, despite being evil, is a better ruler than her replacements and work with her to take back Insectika. The Queen is given Jim's super suit to defeat Psy-Crow and the Professor, but refuses to give it back. Ethel manages to talk the Queen down and decides to stay behind on Insectika.: Villains mentioned: Psy-Crow, Professor Monkey-for-a-Head, Queen Slug-for-a-Butt, Bob the Killer Goldfish, Number Four
18	5	"Evil in Love"	Doug Langdale	October 26, 1996
After meeting and falling in love with Malice the Dog, Evil summons a clown-like demon in a bid to destroy the universe and traps Jim, Peter, and Princess What's-Her-Name in the realm of nightmares, where they face their greatest fears. However, they escape and subdue the demon by calling the Department of Apocalyptic Affairs, who make him fill out several billion years' worth of papers to get a license for universal destruction. Malice departs to another dimension to star in her own television series.: Villains mentioned: Evil the Cat, Henchrat, Malice the Dog, The Fiend Which Dares Not Speak Its Name, The Lord of Nightmares
19	6	"Hyper Psy-Crow"	Doug Langdale	November 2, 1996
While trying to steal Jim's suit, Psy-Crow purchases a powerful dose of coffee that makes him dangerously fast and hyperactive. Jim transforms into a super-mellow state to fight him, but their opposing energies destroy the universe after coming into contact with each other. However, the Great Worm Spirit rescues them and they recreate the universe, being sent back in time to before the events transpired while still remembering them.: Villains mentioned: Psy-Crow, Queen Slug-for-a-Butt, Professor Monkey-for-a-Head, Evil the Cat
20	7	"Peanut of the Apes"	Doug Langdale	November 9, 1996
Jim and Peter attempt to increase their show's ratings and viewership and force one of their viewers, Cody, to partake in a program where he can determine the outcome of their adventures. They discover that Professor Monkey-for-a-Head has created special cosmetics that transform people into apes, planning to profit due to being the only person capable of communicating with primates. Jim and Peter realize that peanuts can reverse the transformation and disperse peanut butter throughout the world to do so.: Villains mentioned: Psy-Crow, Professor Monkey-for-a-Head
21	8	"Lounge Day's Journey Into Night"	Thomas Hart	November 16, 1996
Evil attempts to destroy the universe by making two untalented lounge singers, Morty and Eileen, sing a particularly bad song. Meanwhile, the High Council of superheroes determine that Peter has saved the day more often than Jim and decide to give him Jim's suit and role as hero, while Jim is demoted to sidekick. Evil nearly succeeds in his plan before the show's budget runs out mid-song, enabling Jim to erase him out of existence with the animator's pencil. Peter then decides that he does not deserve the suit and gives it back to Jim.: Villains mentioned: Bob the Killer Goldfish, Number Four, The Great Sturgeon, Evil the Cat, Henchrat, Morty, Eileen, J.T Smiley
22	9	"Wizard of Ooze"	Doug Langdale	November 22, 1996
While fighting Queen Slug-for-a-Butt, Jim and Peter are transported to an alternate dimension akin to The Wizard of Oz. After meeting its counterparts of Walter, the Grim Reaper, and the Hamsternator, the group sets out to meet the Wizard of Ooze in hopes of returning home and obtaining their individual wants. Amidst this, they fight the alternate counterparts of Queen Slug-for-a-Butt and Professor Monkey-for-a-Head, who seek to obtain Jim's sapphire toe socks. After learning that the Wizard cannot give them what they want, the group instead gets them at a mall. Jim and Peter return home via an interdimensional towing service.: Villains mentioned: Queen Slug-for-a-Butt, Professor Monkey-for-a-Head
23	10	"For Whom the Jingle Bell Tolls"	John Loy	December 13, 1996
On Christmas, Queen Slug-for-a-Butt learns of Santa Claus' immense power and seeks to exploit him for her own benefit. Discovering that he is too pure to be controlled through traditional means, she instead brainwashes him using a microchip implanted in his head. Jim manages to free Santa by reminding him of Christmas spirit. Santa assumes his true form as the god Wodin and helps Jim defeat the Queen.: Villains mentioned: Queen Slug-for-a-Butt

== Merchandising ==
MCA/Universal Merchandising held consumer product rights for the series.

Playmates Toys also released a line of action figures based on the show, which included several variants of Earthworm Jim, as well as Peter Puppy, Princess What's-Her-Name, Bob the Killer Goldfish, #4, Evil the Cat, Henchrat, Major Mucus, and Psy-Crow. A mountable "pocket rocket" was also available as well as a rare mail-in repainted figure of Earthworm Jim in a green suit. Premium DNA Toys also made a line of action figures.

== Telecast history ==
=== Original broadcast countries ===
In the United States, the show was aired on Kids' WB on The WB Television Network (now The CW Network) from 1995 to 1996.

The show premiered in the United Kingdom on co-production partner Flextech's TCC network around the same time, and was aired until the channel's closure in April 1998. The show was promoted with a country-wide roadshow campaign held at shopping centres. Following this, the show later made its free TV debut on Channel 4. After TCC's demise, its sister channel Trouble reran the series until 1999. In the 2000s, the show reran on Nickelodeon, Nicktoons TV and Sky One.

=== Internationally ===
HIT Entertainment handled television distribution for the series in Ireland as well as Benelux and Scandinavian territories.

In Ireland, the show was aired on RTÉ Two from 12 September 1996 to 1997. In Canada, the show was aired on YTV. In Mexico, the show was aired on TV Azteca. In Germany, the show was aired on RTL. In the Netherlands, the show was aired on Kindernet. In Poland, the show was aired on RTL 7. In Spain, the series was dubbed in different languages apart from Castilian Spanish, like the Basque language.

== Home media ==
=== United States ===
Four VHS volumes were released by MCA/Universal Home Video in April 1996, each containing two episodes.

The complete series was intended to receive a U.S. DVD release from Visual Entertainment (under license from NBCUniversal) on July 10, 2012, but was delayed right before release to late October. The set includes all 23 episodes on 3 discs, and is currently available on Amazon.com.

The complete series was formerly available on Tubi, but has since been removed.

Name	Release date	Episodes	Region	Additional information
Vol. 1: Bring Me the Head of Earthworm Jim / Sword of Righteousness	April 9, 1996	2	VHS	Includes animation featurette.
Vol. 2: Conqueror Worm / Day of the Fish	April 9, 1996	2	VHS	Includes animation featurette.
Vol. 3: Assault & Battery / Trout!	April 9, 1996	2	VHS	Includes animation featurette.
Vol. 4: The Book of Doom / The Egg Beater	April 9, 1996	2	VHS	Includes animation featurette.
Earthworm Jim: The Complete Series	June 1, 2011	23	4	Includes no bonus features.
Earthworm Jim: Complete Series	November 2012	23	1	Includes no bonus features.

=== Internationally ===
CIC Video released three VHS volumes of the series in the 1990s in the United Kingdom, each containing two episodes. These are now out of print and considered rare.

On June 1, 2011, Via Vision Entertainment, under license from Universal, released the complete series as a 5-disc set in Australia and New Zealand.

== Legacy ==
Aspects of the show, such as newly created characters, or art style, were later implemented in future video games Earthworm Jim 3D and Earthworm Jim: Menace 2 the Galaxy. Two Earthworm Jim comic book series, in the US and UK, were also created to tie into the animated series.

On November 18, 2021, it was reported that a new animated television series titled Earthworm Jim: Beyond the Groovy was in development. A year later, it was announced that Paris animation studio Circus Studios joined Passion Pictures as a partner on the show. In November 2023, series writer Brent Friedman stated that production had been put on hold.
