= Isaac C. Singleton Jr. =

American actor

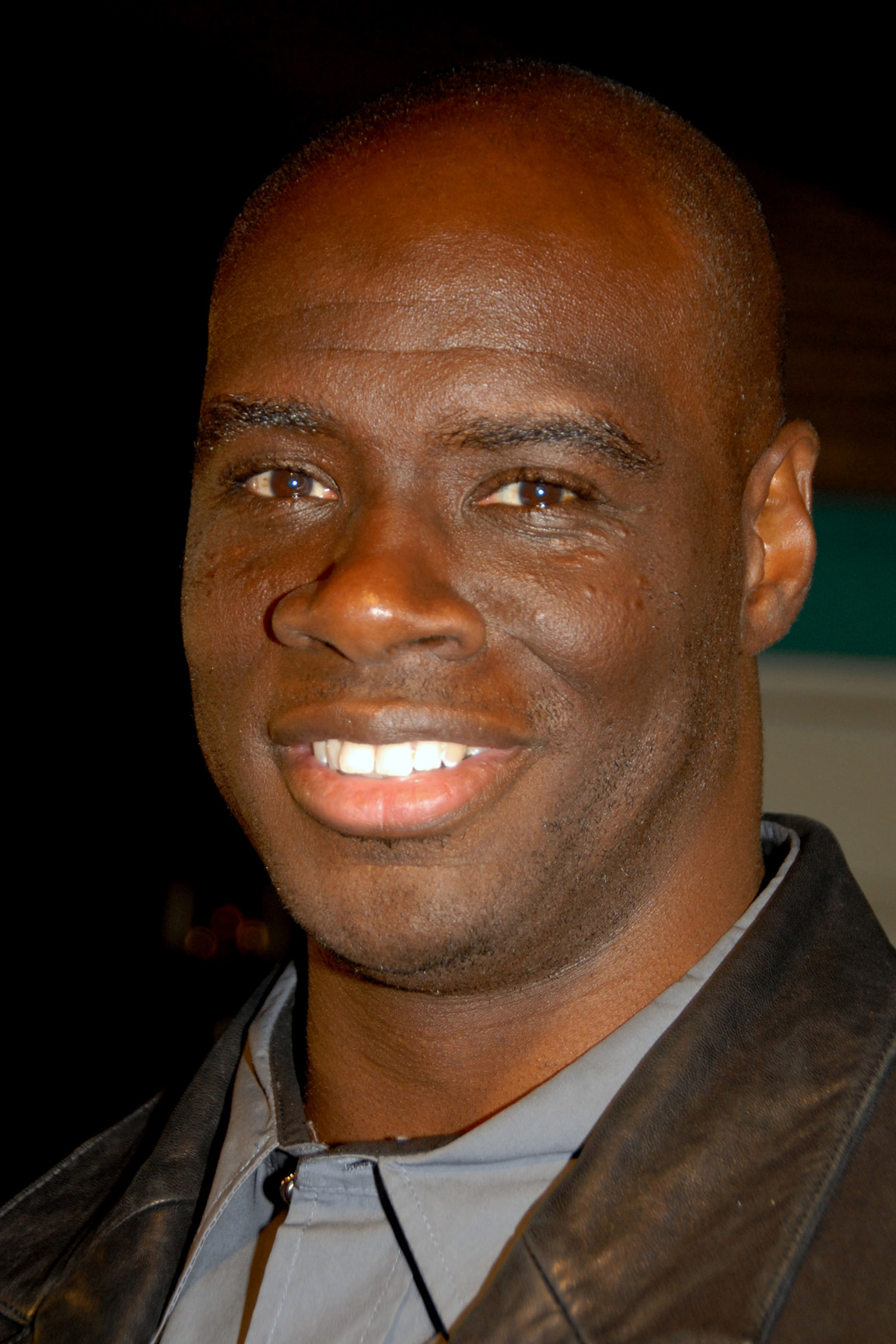
- Singleton in 2010
- Other names: Isaac C. Singleton; Isaac Singleton; Isac Singleton; Isaac Singleton Jr.
- Education: University of Central Florida
- Occupation: Actor
- Years active: 1997–present
- Website: www.isaacsingleton.com

Isaac Charles Singleton Jr. is an American actor. He is known for voicing the Marvel Comics character Thanos in various animated films, television shows and video games, and Sagat in Capcom's Street Fighter series since Street Fighter IV (2008).

== Early life ==
Singleton Jr. is a graduate of the University of Central Florida.

== Filmography ==
=== Film ===
| Year | Title | Role | Ref. |
|---|---|---|---|
| 1999 | Galaxy Quest | Sarris' Guard | |
| 2000 | Charlie's Angels | Kidnapper | |
| 2001 | Planet of the Apes | Limbo's Handler, Ape Soldier | |
| 2003 | Anger Management | Air Marshal | |
| 2003 | Pirates of the Caribbean: The Curse of the Black Pearl | Bo'sun | |
| 2004 | Breaking Dawn | Attendant Rufus | |
| 2005 | 2001 Maniacs | The Butcher | |
| 2007 | Fist of the Warrior | Frank | |
| 2009 | Super Capers | Special Agent Smith #2 | |
| 2010 | Hunter Prey | Commander Karza | |
| 2013 | Inside | Russell | |
| 2013 | Virtually Heroes | Bebop | |
| 2014 | Bullet | Promoter | |
| 2014 | Ninja Apocalypse | Skye | |
| 2016 | Deadpool | Boothe | |
| 2016 | Characterz | Franklin Jefferson Washington | |
| 2017 | Larceny | Tank | |
| 2018 | Beyond White Space | Lt. Boomer | |
| 2019 | Deep Murder | Sexy Fireman | |
| 2023 | Welcome to Redville | Chester | |
| 2024 | Transformers One | Darkwing (voice) | |
| 2025 | Bad Men Must Bleed | Brighton | |

=== Television ===
| Year | Title | Role | Notes | Ref. |
|---|---|---|---|---|
| 1997 | The Mystery Files of Shelby Woo | Terry Hayward | Episode: "The Smoke Screen Case" | |
| 1998 | The X-Files | 1st Roughneck | Episode: "Triangle" | |
| 1999 | Sabrina: The Teenage Witch | Bouncer | Episode: "Sabrina and the Pirates" | |
| 1999 | Martial Law | Maggio | Episode: "My Man Sammo" | |
| 2000 | Cowboy Bebop | Nero (voice) | English dub Episode: "Black Dog Serenade" | |
| 2001 | Crossing Jordan | Rudy Coombs | Episode: "Blue Christmas" | |
| 2003 | Hellsing | Incognito (voice) | English dub 5 episodes | |
| 2008 | The Sarah Silverman Program | Tricky-D | Episode: "Kangamangus" | |
| 2009 | Monster | Peter Jurgens (voice) | English dub Episode: "Monster's Abyss" | |
| 2014 | Community | Destro (voice) | Episode: "G.I. Jeff" | |
| 2014–2015 | Avengers Assemble | Thanos (voice) | 5 episodes | |
| 2015–2019 | Guardians of the Galaxy | Thanos (voice) | 15 episodes | |
| 2017 | Bones | Orderly Sam Wadkins | Episode: "The Final Chapter: The New Tricks in the Old Dogs" | |
| 2017 | Criminal Minds | Orderly | Episode: "Lucky Strikes" | |
| 2017 | Lego Marvel Super Heroes - Guardians of the Galaxy: The Thanos Threat | Thanos (voice) | Television special | |
| 2018 | Lego Marvel Super Heroes: Black Panther - Trouble in Wakanda | Thanos (voice) | Television special | |
| 2018 | Agents of S.H.I.E.L.D. | Kree Vicar | 2 episodes | |
| 2019 | Where's Waldo? | Mr. Grouchy (voice) | Episode: "Victoria Falls & Winters" | |
| 2020 | The Mandalorian | Twi'lek Doorman | Episode: "Chapter 9: The Marshal" | |
| 2022 | Heroes of Extinction | Fractus (voice) | 7 episodes (audio drama) | |

=== Video games ===
| Year | Title | Role | Notes | Ref. |
|---|---|---|---|---|
| 2004 | The Lord of the Rings: The Battle for Middle-earth | Lurtz | | |
| 2005 | The Incredibles: Rise of the Underminer | Additional voices | | |
| 2006 | The Lord of the Rings: The Battle for Middle-earth II | Lurtz | | |
| 2006 | The Lord of the Rings: The Battle for Middle-earth II: The Rise of the Witch-king | Lurtz | | |
| 2006 | Tom Clancy's Rainbow Six: Vegas | Michael Walters | | |
| 2008 | Street Fighter IV | Sagat | | |
| 2008 | Spider-Man: Web of Shadows | Park Avenue Leader | | |
| 2008 | World of Warcraft: Wrath of the Lich King | Ormorok, Tharon'ja | | |
| 2010 | Super Street Fighter IV | Sagat | | |
| 2010 | Transformers: War for Cybertron | Soundwave | | |
| 2010 | Starcraft II Series | Archon, Stone Zealot, Dark Archon | | |
| 2010 | Pinball FX 2 | Thanos | | |
| 2010 | World of Warcraft: Cataclysm | Horrid Abomination, Rom'ogg Bonecrusher, Forgemaster Throngus | | |
| 2010 | Transformers: Dark of the Moon | Soundwave | | |
| 2012 | Street Fighter X Tekken | Sagat | | |
| 2012 | Transformers: Fall of Cybertron | Soundwave | | |
| 2012 | Halo 4 | Hoya | | |
| 2012 | Hitman: Absolution | Sanchez | | |
| 2013 | God of War: Ascension | Multiplayer Soldier | | |
| 2013 | Batman: Arkham Origins | Officer Marks, Hobo | | |
| 2013 | Dead Rising 3 | Male Zombie | | |
| 2014 | Hearthstone | Malygos | | |
| 2014 | The Amazing Spider-Man 2 | Street Brute | | |
| 2014 | Ultra Street Fighter IV | Sagat | | |
| 2014 | Transformers: Rise of the Dark Spark | Soundwave | | |
| 2014 | The Evil Within | Neun, Zehn | | |
| 2015 | Heroes of the Storm | Stitches | | |
| 2015 | Batman: Arkham Knight | Albert King | | |
| 2015 | Disney Infinity 3.0 | Thanos | | |
| 2016 | Lego Marvel's Avengers | Thanos | | |
| 2016 | Street Fighter V | Sagat | | |
| 2017 | Fortnite | Thanos | | |
| 2017 | Agents of Mayhem | Buckley Roberts / Steeltoe, Hauser | | |
| 2017 | Marvel vs. Capcom: Infinite | Thanos | | |
| 2017 | Dropzone | Vise | | |
| 2018 | Marvel Powers United VR | Thanos | | |
| 2018 | Quake Champions | Scalebearer | | |
| 2019 | Marvel Ultimate Alliance 3: The Black Order | Thanos | | |
| 2020 | Half-Life: Alyx | Combine Suppressor | | |
| 2020 | Yakuza: Like a Dragon | Additional voices | Credited as Isaac Singleton | |
| 2021 | Lost Judgment | Additional voices | Credited as Isaac Singleton | |
| 2023 | Like a Dragon Gaiden: The Man Who Erased His Name | Additional voices | Credited as Isaac Singleton Jr. | |
| 2023 | Diablo IV | Additional voices | | |
| 2024 | Like a Dragon: Infinite Wealth | Additional voices | Credited as Isaac Singleton Jr | |
| 2025 | Like a Dragon: Pirate Yakuza in Hawaii | Additional voices | Credited as Isaac Singleton Jr. | |
| 2025 | Street Fighter 6 | Sagat | | |
| 2025 | Marvel Cosmic Invasion | Thanos, Uatu, Knull | | |
