= Two Witches =

Two Witches may refer to:

- Two Witches (band), a gothic rock band from Finland
- Two Witches (film), a 2021 American horror film
