= Rebekah Kennedy =

American actress

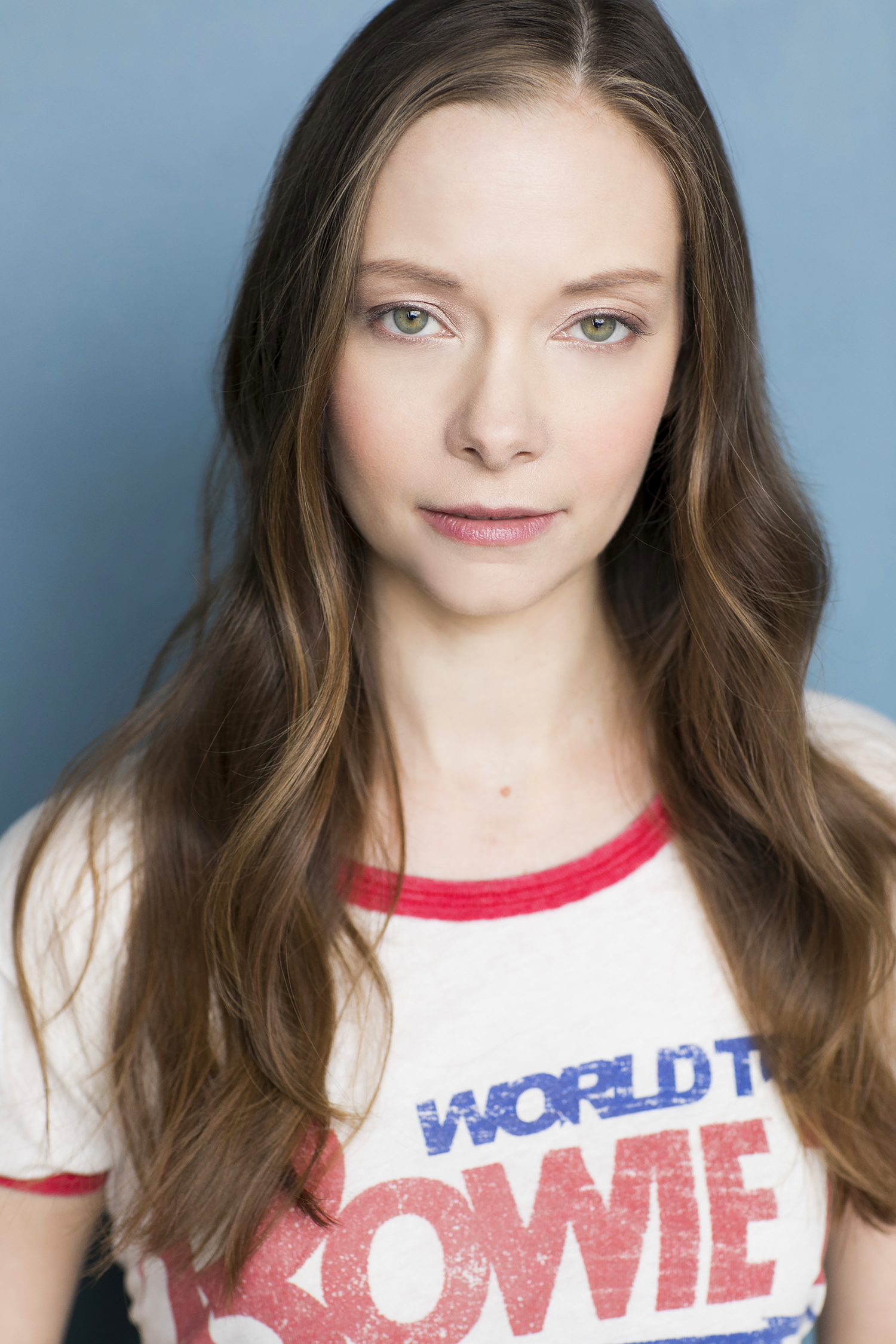
- Born: Arlington, Texas, United States
- Occupation: Actress
- Years active: 2007–present

Rebekah Kennedy is an American actress. She is best known for her work on Law & Order: Special Victims Unit, Bastard and House Hunting.

== Life and career ==
Rebekah was born in Arlington, Texas. She holds a B.A. in Musical Theatre from Palm Beach Atlantic University. In 2011, she had her first big screen role in the movie Season of the Witch, with Nicolas Cage and Ron Perlman. In 2012, she played the lead role in the film House Hunting, with Marc Singer and Art LaFleur.

Rebekah has also acted in numerous television series, including Law & Order: Special Victims Unit and Criminal Minds. She also known for her role as Penny in Netflix's To the Bone.

Rebekah was hired to portray Poe Webb, the protagonist of the Carter Wilson novel Tell Me What You Did. The novel has QR codes of links to video files, where Rebekah, as Poe, narrates exxerpts of the story through Poe's true crime podcast, where Poe describes her mother's murder and Poe's vigilante murder of the killer. In the novel, a stalker calls into Poe's show and begins to threaten her as retribution.

== Filmography ==
=== Film ===
Year	Title	Role	Notes
2007	Hotel Etiquette	Bible-toting Goth Girl	Short film
2008	The Last Time I Saw You	Juliet	Short film
2008	Karma Police	City Dweller	
2008	Tears of Blood	Jenny Walker	Short film
2008	Stalker's Dating Guide	Rhonda	Short film
2008	Killing Holly	Susan	
2009	Defending Dr. Karl	Crazy Witness	Short film
2009	Hell's Fury: Wanted Dead or Alive	Rachel	
2010	Nothing Left	Lauren	Short film
2010	Virgin Mary Christmas	Tennie	Short film
2010	Sunny in the Dark	Sunny	Short film
2011	Season of the Witch	Peasant Turk Girl	
2011	Wuss	Vagina Girl	
2011	In Kind	Jamie Drake	Short film
2011	Creature	Caroline	
2011	Yankee Rose	Rose	Short film
2011	The Curse of Babylon	Faith Riley	
2011	Succubus	Conny	Short film
2011	New Animal	Claire	Short film
2012	Are We Listening?	Rebecca	Short film
2012	I Am... Gabriel	Camrynn Ford	
2012	Off the Grid	Christina Rush	Short film
2012	House Hunting	Hanna	
2013	The Underneath	Young Creature	
2014	Crimes of the Mind	Kelly	
2014	Alongside Night	Marilyn Danforth	
2015	The High Schoolers Guide to College Parties	Slutty Cheerleader	
2015	Bastard	Betty	
2015	Street Level	Easy	
2016	The Conduit	Young Amy	
2016	Dallas, Sunday Morning	Karen Carlin	Short film
2017	Let Me Make You a Martyr	Libby	
2017	To the Bone	Penny	
2017	Amy	Mary	Short film
2017	No Empathy	Sam	Short film
2019	Limbo	Mary Florence	
2020	The Great Illusion	Diane Lorne	
2020	A Dark Foe	Albino Girl	
2021	Two Witches	Masha	
2021	Los Angeles	Jojo	
2024	Traumatika	Abigail	

=== Television ===
Year	Title	Role	Notes
2011	Memphis Beat	Christie Thomas	Episode: Flesh and Blood
2011	Ghostbreakers	Norma Bates	Episode: Case File #60 'Motherstuffer'
2011-2012	Throwing Stones	Chrissy Holden	16 episodes
2014	Match	Emily	Episode: Tonight
2015	V.O. The Show	Rhonda	Episode: Braughmadeus
2016	Criminal Minds	Gina Bryant	Episode: Hostage
2018	Law & Order: Special Victims Unit	Esther Labott	Episode: The Book of Esther

=== Podcast ===
Year	Title	Role	Notes
2024	What Happened in Skinner	Loretta Van Tassel	Episode: March 17th, 1899
