= List of Georgia State Panthers men's basketball head coaches =

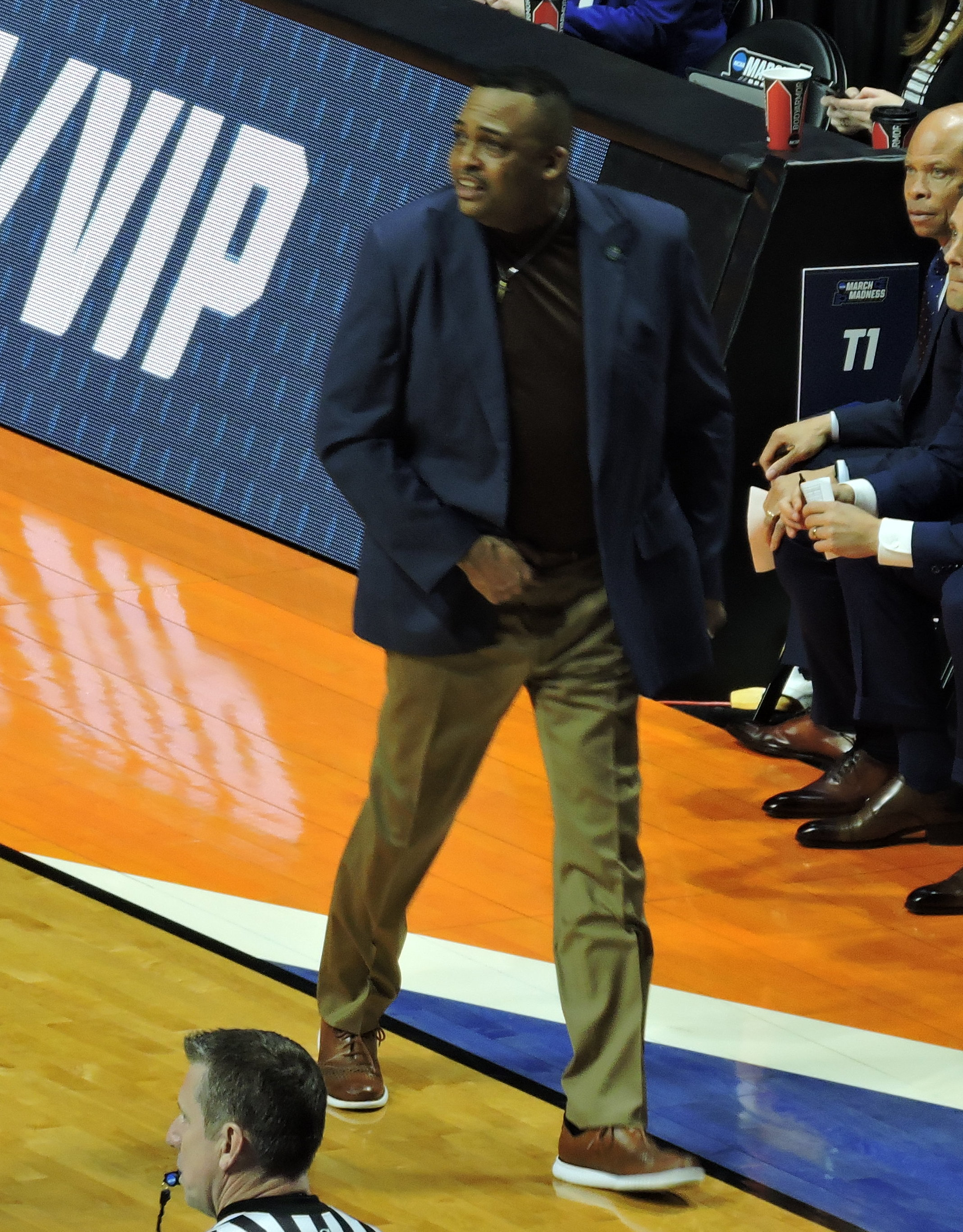
Ron Hunter, the winningest head coach in Panthers men's basketball history.

The following is a list of Georgia State Panthers men's basketball head coaches. There have been 16 head coaches of the Panthers in their 60-season history.

Georgia State's current head coach is Jonas Hayes. He was hired as the Panthers' head coach in April 2022, replacing Rob Lanier, who left to become the head coach at SMU.

No.	Tenure	Coach	Years	Record	Pct.
1	1963–1964	Stoney Burgess	1	1–21	.045
2	1964–1967	Dick Wehr	3	8–57	.123
3	1967–1970; 1972–1977	Jack Waters	8	52–140	.271
4	1970–1971	Frank Davis	1	5–16	.238
5	1971–1972	Roger McDowell	1	5–19	.208
6	1977–1981	Roger Couch	4	22–85	.206
7	1981–1983	Jim Jarrett	2	13–42	.236
8	1983–1984 (Note: Pugliese was fired on December 4, 1984 after three games. Mark Slonaker was named interim coach for the remainder of the 1984–85 season.)	Tom Pugliese	2	7–24	.226
–	1984–1985*	Mark Slonaker	1	1–24	.040
9	1985–1994	Bob Reinhart	9	107–148	.420
10	1994–1997	Carter Wilson	3	31–50	.383
11	1997–2003 (Note: Driesell retired in January 2003 after 10 games. Michael Perry was named interim coach for the remainder of the 2002–03 season.)	Lefty Driesell	6	103–59	.636
12	2003–2007 (Note: After serving as interim head coach for the end of the 2002–03 season, Perry was named permanent head coach in April 2003.)	Michael Perry	5	62–75	.453
13	2007–2011 (Note: Barnes was fired in February 2011, just before the CAA tournament. Paul Graham was named interim coach for the tournament.)	Rod Barnes	4	44–79	.358
–	2011*	Paul Graham	1	1–1	.500
14	2011–2019	Ron Hunter	8	171–95	.643
15	2019–2022	Rob Lanier	3	53–30	.639
16	2022–present	Jonas Hayes	1	10–21	.323
Totals		16 coaches	60 seasons	696–986	.414
Records updated through end of 2022–23 season * - Denotes interim head coach. Source
