= Ninja Apocalypse =

- Film poster
- Directed by: Lloyd Lee Barnett
- Written by: Ashley Scott Meyers
- Produced by: Shawn Austin; Mark Heidelberger
- Starring: Christian Oliver; Les Brandt; Cary-Hiroyuki Tagawa; Tara Macken
- Cinematography: Aashish Gandhi
- Edited by: Max Carlson
- Music by: Tim Montijo
- Production company: Ninja Production Services
- Release date: August 5, 2014
- Running time: 83 minutes
- Country: United States
- Language: English

Ninja Apocalypse is a 2014 American martial arts film directed by Lloyd Lee Barnett, written by Ashley Scott Meyers, and starring Christian Oliver, Les Brandt, Tara Macken, Kaiwi Lyman, and Isaac C. Singleton Jr. as ninjas who are framed for the assassination of a respected clan leader (Cary-Hiroyuki Tagawa). It was released direct-to-video on August 5, 2014.

== Plot ==
In a post-apocalyptic future where the survivors have banded together into ninja clans, representatives of the Lost Ninja Clan – brothers Cage and Surge, deaf-mute Sky, Trillion, and Mar – are called to an underground bunker to attend a peace conference. Each of the ninja clans has a magic power, and the Lost Ninja Clan control electricity. Fumitaka, a respected clan leader, believes that the disparate ninja clans are under threat by an external force. He proposes that they band together to increase their chances of survival. Though this is well received by the assembled clans, he is assassinated at the end of his speech. Three witnesses step forward to identify Cage, the leader of the Lost Ninja Clan, as the assassin. Confused and protesting his innocence, Cage leads his clan to safety as they fight through the hostile crowd. Cage uses most of his magical power reserves to temporarily knock most of the other ninja unconscious.

The Lost Ninja Clan separate to explore the bunker; each fight off several opponents, though Mar is eventually overwhelmed and killed. After they bury Mar, Trillion leads them to an elevator he scouted. They fight through ninja commanded by Becker, head of a rival ninja clan that uses fire-based powers, and each clan accuses the other of being Fumitaka's assassin. However, the elevator is a decoy, and it takes them to the bottom level, where the Lost Ninja Clan encounter hordes of zombies. Trillion is bitten, and the clan panics. Surge and Cage fight for leadership of the clan until Sky steps in to stop them. A repeating message from Hiroshi, Fumitaka's lieutenant, reveals the existence of a second, working elevator, though it cuts out before he can give the location. The clan fights through the zombies to the working elevator, and Sky sacrifices himself to give the others a chance to escape.

Demoralized, the survivors continue on, only to be stopped by the Siren Clan, an all-female clan composed of seeming clones. Initially friendly, the Siren Clan seduces the Lost Ninja Clan, then viciously attacks. Trillion is killed, and Surge is poisoned. Cage and Surge fight their way to the exit, where Becker again confronts them. Cage and Becker fight each other; when Cage spares Becker's life, Becker questions Cage's guilt. As Cage and Surge stop to get medicine, a double of Cage appears and stabs Surge. Hiroshi reveals himself as a shapeshifter and says that he killed Fumitaka to prevent Cage from becoming Fumitaka's new lieutenant. Weakened and with his powers exhausted, Cage is outmatched by Hiroshi. Before Hiroshi can finish off Cage, Surge recovers and kills Hiroshi. Afterward, Becker, impressed with Cage's honor and skill, swears loyalty to him.

== Cast ==
- Christian Oliver as Cage
- Les Brandt as Surge
- Tara Macken as Mar
- Cary-Hiroyuki Tagawa as Fumitaka
- Ernie Reyes Jr as Hiroshi
- Isaac C. Singleton Jr. as Skye
- Kaiwi Lyman as Trillion
- West Liang as Becker
- Antoinette Kalaj as Siren

== Production ==
Shawn Austin, founder of Big Boss Creative, produced the film after becoming interested in expanding his involvement in the entertainment business. Instead of producing a film and finding a distributor, he went directly to the distribution companies and asked them what they wanted. They told him that ninja films were currently in demand. Distribution partners rejected the first version of the script as not representative enough of ninja. A second draft, with more elements of ninja lore, such as swords and fantastic powers, was accepted. Shooting took place over 12 days. The visual effects were performed by director Lloyd Lee Barnett, who had previous experience.

== Release ==
A screening took place at the 2014 San Diego Comic Con. Ninja Apocalypse was released direct-to-video on August 5, 2014, in the United States.

== Reception ==
Reviews were mixed; positive reviews highlighted the fight choreography, while negatives ones criticized the plot as derivative. Paul Mount of Starburst rated it 2/10 and wrote, "Horribly bland and charmless, Ninja Apocalypse will surely only appeal to undemanding action fans who still can't resist the allure of any tacky film with the word 'ninja' in the title." Nav Qateel of Influx Magazine rated it D+ and wrote, "The bottom line is, the writing wasn't very good, the direction was lacking and the acting was uneven."
