= The Memory Thief =

- Directed by: Gil Kofman
- Written by: Gil Kofman
- Produced by: Gil Kofman; Marika Van Adelsburg; Amy Ziering
- Starring: Mark Webber; Rachel Miner; Jerry Adler; Allan Rich; Peter Jacobson; Douglas Spain; Blu de Golyer
- Cinematography: Richard Rutkowski
- Edited by: Curtiss Clayton
- Music by: Ted Reichman
- Distributed by: Seventh Art Releasing
- Release dates: April 14, 2007 (Philadelphia Film Festival, Cambridge Film Festival); July 12, 2007
- Running time: 95 minutes
- Country: United States
- Language: English

The Memory Thief is a 2007 American independent drama film. It was written and directed by Gil Kofman and features Mark Webber and Rachel Miner in the leading roles. The film chronicles the experiences of a young man who becomes involved in documenting the experiences of survivors of the Holocaust, as his commitment turns into obsession and madness. The film, which was Kofman’s feature debut as a feature director, was shot on DV. Critical reviews of the film were generally favourable.

== Plot ==
Lukas is a young man who works as a tollbooth operator. He does not have much of a social life, has few memories of his childhood, and spends much of his free time visiting his catatonic mother in the hospital. One day, one of the tollbooth customers tosses him a copy of Hitler's Mein Kampf, and Lukas reads it, prompting a Holocaust survivor to berate Lukas as he drives through Lukas's booth. The next day the old man gives him a videotape containing his testimony from the concentration camps. Watching the tape, Lukas becomes captivated, particularly after he spots the old man's obituary in the newspaper, and decides to attend the funeral. Mira, a young medical student, confronts him for attending a funeral without knowing the deceased and asks him to leave but relents after Lukas shows her the witness tape. While visiting his mother in the hospital, he runs into Mira again, and the two begin dating.

Lukas gets a job working for a Holocaust remembrance organization that conducts interviews of survivors. At this point, Lukas's behavior becomes obsessive. He hoards interview tapes, watching several simultaneously on different television sets. He wears a yellow star, plasters his wall with pictures from Holocaust camps, and buys lottery tickets based on the interviewees' tattooed identification numbers from the camps. He writes long letters to the filmmaker Horowitz, who has made a movie about the Holocaust. He gives a pink triangle to his transgender co-worker, Dominique. He demands that all German cars use a different lane at his tollbooth. Mira and other Jews become concerned about his obsession with Holocaust memories and Jewish customs, especially since he is not Jewish himself. Eventually he persuades Mira's father, also a camp survivor, to record an interview. The Holocaust foundation fires Lukas for doing an interview before he is trained. The burden of recalling the memories is too much for Mira's father, who kills himself. Mira blames Lukas for her father's death, and Lukas is devastated.

Lukas buys his own camera and wanders the streets pushing the camera in people's faces, asking them if they are Jewish, and telling them that they are lucky to be alive. His erratic behavior gets him fired. He comes to believe that he himself is the last Holocaust survivor. He shaves his head and gets an identification number tattooed on his arm. He picks a fight with a group of neo-Nazi skinheads, and is beaten. The woman in the next bed to his mother in the hospital accuses him of not being her son at all, and he does not deny it. He gives away his shoes to his co-worker, and dons a home made concentration camp prisoner uniform as he embarks on what he describes as a death march.

== Cast ==
- Mark Webber as Lukas
- Rachel Miner as Mira
- Jerry Adler as Mr. Zweig
- Allan Rich as Zvi Birnbaum
- Peter Jacobson as Mr. Freeman
- Douglas Spain as Dominic
- Stella Hudgens as Amanda
- Carlos Gomez as Amanda's father
- Karen Landry as Mother
- Mary Pat Gleason as Hospital patient (Mary)
- Richard Riehle as Judaica store clerk
- Carlucci Weyant as Chris
- Blu de Golyer as Skinhead

== Production ==
The Memory Thief was the first feature film directed by the Nigerian-born playwright Gil Kofman. Kofman himself had married into a family of Holocaust survivors, so the topic of the film related to his personal life. In the interview sequences shown, the movie makes use of the testimonies of actual Holocaust survivors.

== Reception ==
The Memory Thief received mostly favorable reviews from critics. The review aggregate website Rotten Tomatoes gave the movie a 79% fresh rating, based on 14 reviews. Jeannette Catsoulis, writing for The New York Times, called it "a strange and melancholy journey to the heart of madness," and she commended the way the movie presented a counterbalance to formulaic Hollywood movies about the Holocaust. Maureen M. Hart of the Chicago Tribune wrote that Kofman had "crafted an unusual tale of post-traumatic stress and pain and the ownership thereof," and she singled out for praise Jerry Adler's performance as an old Holocaust survivor. Leba Hertz, on the other hand, in a review for the San Francisco Chronicle, complained that "something rings false" about the movie. For instance, she had difficulties understanding why a girl like Mira should be attracted to someone such as Lukas.
