= Kevin Shulman =

American film director

- Occupations: Write, Producer, Director
- Years active: 2007-
- Notable work: Her Dark Past, Charlie Says, I Am Fear

Kevin Shulman is an American producer, writer, and director of music videos and feature films.

== Biography ==
As a director and producer of music videos he has worked with such artists as Jason Derulo, Juicy J, The Game, Omarion, Billy Morrison and Academy Award winners, Three 6 Mafia.

In 2016, Shulman directed the cable television movie Her Dark Past for Lifetime Network. He produced, directed and co-wrote the horror feature I Am Fear which was released on Feb. 20, 2020. The film stars Kristina Klebe, Eoin Macken, Bill Moseley, Faran Tahir, and William Forsythe.

== Charlie Says controversy ==
In 2018, Shulman along with producing partner Jeremy Rosen, produced Charlie Says. The film reunited the American Psycho filmmaking duo of Mary Harron and Guinevere Turner in an unexplored view of the Charles Manson murders. The film focuses on the women in Manson's cult, facing life imprisonment and is based on the books The Family, by Ed Saunders and The Long Prison Journey of Leslie Van Houten, by Karlene Faith. The film premiered at the Venice Film Festival, was nominated for Best Director and is scheduled for theatrical release in 2019 by IFC.

In September 2018, Shulman filed suit in Los Angeles Superior Court against the other producers of Charlie Says. The suit says they illegally cut his percentage on the film and only gave him credit for a reduced role. Shulman was recovering from cancer at the time. On February 9, 2023, in one of the first jury trials to decide the value of a motion picture producer credit, Shulman was awarded $1.9M, including over $1M in damages related to fraud.

== Selected music videos ==
Year	Artist	Song	Role
2007	D.I.	On the Western Front	Director
2007	Mims	Like This	Producer
2008	Project Pat F. Three 6 Mafia	Keep it Hood	Director
2008	Three 6 Mafia ft. Unk	I'd Rather (Uncensored version)	Director
2008	Menudo	Perdido Sin Ti	Director
2008	Yung Berg	Put it on me	Director
2008	Yung Berg	Outerspace	Director
2008	ICP F. Kottonmouth Kings	Think for Yourself	Director
2008	The Game f. Keisha Cole	Games Pain	Producer
2008	Nipsey Hussle	Bullets	Director
2009	Marques Houston	Case of You	Director
2009	Marques Houston	How I do	Director
2009	Marques Houston	Date	Director
2010	Omarion	Speedin	Director
2010	Jason Derulo	Sky's the Limit	Director
2010	Nipsey Hussle	Bullets	Writer, Director
2011	Mann f. Jason Derulo	Text	Writer, Director

== Filmography ==
Year	Film	Role
2007	Eyes of Samir (Short)	Co-Writer, Producer, Director
2015	Paddy's in the Boot (Short)	Director
2016	Her Dark Past	Director
2019	Charlie Says	Producer
2019	I Am Fear	Writer, Director, Producer

== Awards ==
Boston International Film Festival
Year	Nominee / work	Award	Result
2015	Paddy's in the Boot	Indie Soul Special Recognition Award	Won

International Filmmaker Festival of World Cinema, London
Year	Nominee / work	Award	Result
2015	Paddy's in the Boot	Best Director	Nominated
2015	Paddy's in the Boot	Best Short Film	Nominated
