= Marietta Marich =

American actress (1930–2017)

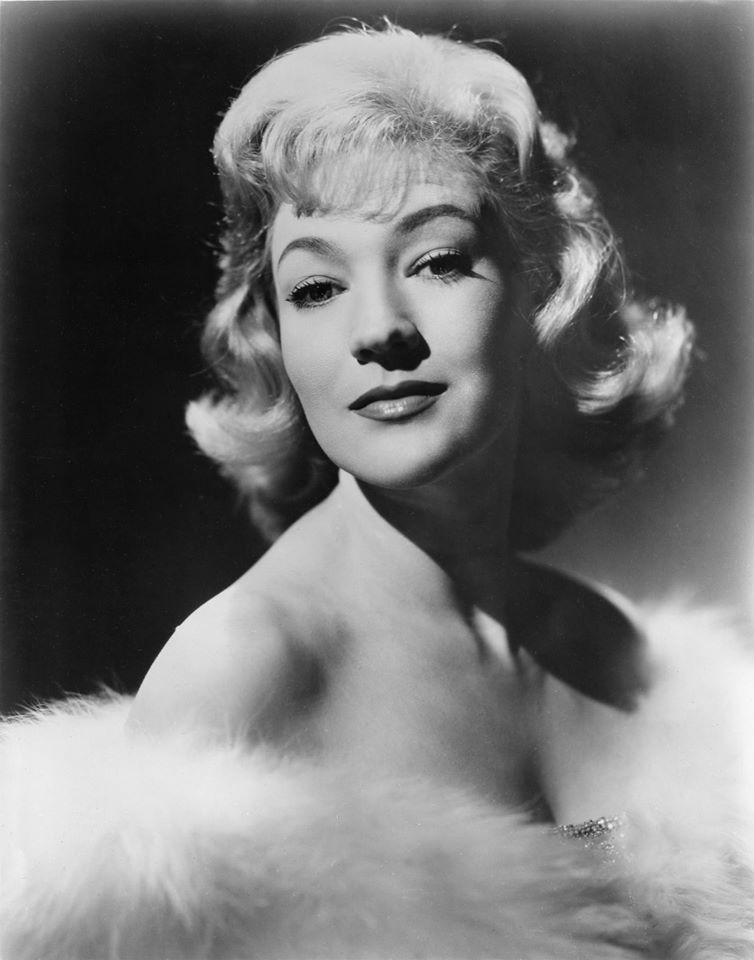
- Marich in 1963
- Born: Marietta Cox; April 5, 1930; Dallas, Texas, U.S.
- Died: September 28, 2017 (aged 87); Houston, Texas, U.S.
- Occupation: Actress
- Spouse: Robert Marich (m. 1952; died 2012)
- Children: 2

Marietta Marich (/ˈmærɪk/; née Cox; April 5, 1930 – September 28, 2017) was an American actress, singer, writer, stage director, and television host. Born in Dallas, Texas, Marich became a prominent stage actress in Houston beginning in the 1950s. She later began appearing in films in the 1980s, making her screen debut in Courtship (1987). She subsequently appeared in a number of films in supporting roles, including Simple Men (1992), Leap of Faith (1992), and Wes Anderson's Rushmore (1998).

Marich garnered renewed attention for her portrayal of Luda Mae Hewitt, mother of Leatherface, in the 2003 remake of The Texas Chainsaw Massacre, as well as its prequel, The Texas Chainsaw Massacre: The Beginning (2006). Her final film appearance was in House of Good and Evil (2013), before her death in 2017 of aortic dissection, aged 87.

== Biography ==
Marich was born Marietta Cox in Dallas, Texas on April 5, 1930. Both her parents were performers, and she began appearing in theatrical productions with them at USO events in her childhood. She also sang in the Tommy Dorsey Orchestra.

In the 1950s, Marich became a well-known figure in Houston, where she hosted her own local television show, called Midnight With Marietta, and operated several live theaters in Houston of which she was principal director. She originated the role of Miss Mona in the first Houston version of The Best Little Whorehouse in Texas in 1979, but was subsequently fired from the production due to professional clashes with the theater company. Marich responded that she had been fired "because I am a perfectionist, and I made demands for perfection."

Marich made her feature film debut in the 1987 film Courtship. She went on to appear in supporting roles in a number of films throughout the late 1980s and 1990s, including Simple Men (1992), Leap of Faith (1993), Children of the Corn IV: The Gathering (1996), Two Mothers for Zachary (1998), and Wes Anderson's cult film Rushmore (also 1998).

In her later years, she became known for her roles in horror films, including the 2003 remake of The Texas Chainsaw Massacre, starring Jessica Biel. Marich reprised her role as Luda Mae Hewitt in the 2006 prequel, The Texas Chainsaw Massacre: The Beginning. In 2013, she replaced fellow veteran actress Tippi Hedren in House of Good and Evil.

== Personal life ==
Marich was married to former radio host Bob Marich who predeceased her in 2012. They had a son, actor Michael Marich, and a daughter, Allison, who portrayed a younger version of Marietta's character in The Texas Chainsaw Massacre: The Beginning.

== Death ==
Marich died on September 28, 2017, in Memorial Hermann Hospital in Houston, following complications from an aortic dissection. Her memorial service took place at the Grace Presbyterian Church in Houston, where she was a member.

== Filmography ==
Year	Title	Role	Director(s)	Notes	Ref.
1987	Courtship	Aunt Sarah	Howard Cummings		
1988	Full Moon in Blue Water	Lois	Peter Masterson		
1989	The Fulfillment of Mary Gray	Aunt Mabel	Piers Haggard	Television film	
1992	Simple Men	Mom	Hal Hartley		
1992	Leap of Faith	Mrs. Hawkins	Richard Pearce		
1993	A Perfect World	Farmer's Wife	Clint Eastwood		
1995	A Woman of Independent Means	Mama	Robert Greenwald	Miniseries	
1995	The Stars Fell on Henrietta	Adult Pauline	James Keach	Voice narration	
1995	In the Name of Love: A Texas Tragedy	Mrs. Jennings	Bill D'Elia	Television film	
1995	She Fought Alone	Mrs. Johnson	Christopher Leitch	Television film	
1995	Two Mothers for Zachary	Melba	Peter Werner	Television film	
1996	Children of the Corn IV: The Gathering	Rosa Nock	Greg Spence		
1998	Rushmore	Mrs. Guggenheim	Wes Anderson		
2000	Clean and Narrow	Arlene Riley	William Katt		
2000	Picnic	Mrs. Potts	Ivan Passer	Television film	
2000	Lone Star Struck	Ellie Thelma Betty Lou	Rod Davis		
2003	The Texas Chainsaw Massacre	Luda Mae Hewitt	Marcus Nispel		
2006	The Texas Chainsaw Massacre: The Beginning	Luda Mae Hewitt	Jonathan Liebesman		
2013	House of Good and Evil	Mrs. Anderson	David Mun		

== Select stage credits ==
Year	Title	Role	Location	Notes	Ref.
1953	Miranda	Miranda	Lee College Auditorium		
1955	Oklahoma!	Laurey	Houston Theatre, Inc.		
1963	Champagne Revue	—N/a	USS Bushnell, Galveston, Texas	Director	
1966	The Sound of Music	Maria von Trapp	Houston Theater, Inc.		
1969	Mary, Mary	—N/a	Holiday Dinner Theatre, Houston	Director	
1969	Don't Drink the Water	—N/a	Holiday Dinner Theatre, Houston	Director	
1970	Three Bags Full	—N/a	Holiday Dinner Theatre, Houston	Director	
1970	The Festival	—N/a	Holiday Dinner Theatre, Houston	Director	
1975	The King and I	Anna	Theatre Under the Stars		
1975	Kiss or Make Up	—N/a	Dean Goss Dinner Theatre, Houston	Director	
1979	The Best Little Whorehouse in Texas	Miss Mona	Tower Theater, Houston		
1981	Mame	Mame	College of the Mainland Theatre		
