= I Am Fear =

2020 film by Kevin Shulman

- Directed by: Kevin Shulman
- Written by: Kevin Shulman, Nathaniel Shulman
- Produced by: Jeremy M. Rosen, Kevin Shulman
- Starring: Kristina Klebe, Eoin Macken, Faran Tahir, Christian Oliver, Bill Moseley, William Forsythe
- Cinematography: Robert Royds
- Edited by: Brody Gusar
- Music by: Gregory Tripi
- Production company: Roxwell Films AXIOM 8 Shout! Factory
- Distributed by: Roxwell Films
- Release date: February 21, 2020
- Running time: 87 minutes
- Country: United States
- Language: English

I Am Fear is a 2020 horror film directed by Kevin Shulman.

== Premise ==
A journalist is kidnapped by a sleeper cell of terrorists in the Los Angeles area who are threatening to behead her live over a webcast on July 4 weekend. As the date approaches, supernatural forces begin to influence the terrorist's sanity. The events of the film are set against the backdrop of Southern California wildfires.

== Cast ==
- William Forsythe as Marco
- Bill Moseley as Steve McReedy
- Eoin Macken as Joshua
- Faran Tahir as Asad
- Kristina Klebe as Sara Brown
- Christian Oliver as Polo
- Guinevere Turner as Holly Simon
- Fahim Fazli as Rashid
- Victoria Summer as Alicia Minnette
- Joseph Gilbert as R.J. Stock
- Tom Fitzpatrick as Professor
- Said Faraj as Bashu
- Joseph Kamal as Ra'ar
- Iyad Hajjaj as Ahmad
- Maggie Parto as Shabaviz's Wife
- Kelsa Kinsly as Prosecutor
- Alberto Zeni as Jalliel
- Ali Saam as Shabaviz

== Release ==
I Am Fear received a theatrical release on February 20, 2020 in five markets. It was released on VOD, DVD and Blu-ray on March 3, 2020.
