= Traumatika =

- Theatrical release poster
- Directed by: Pierre Tsigaridis
- Written by: Maxime Rancon; Pierre Tsigaridis
- Produced by: Maxime Rancon; Pierre Tsigaridis Co-producer Jean Pierre Morreale Investor Jean Pierre Morreale
- Starring: Rebekah Kennedy; Ranen Navat; Emily Goss; Susan Gayle Watts
- Cinematography: Pierre Tsigaridis
- Edited by: Pierre Tsigaridis
- Music by: Gioacchino Marincola
- Production company: The Rancon Company
- Distributed by: Saban Films
- Release dates: August 24, 2024 (FrightFest); September 12, 2025 (United States)
- Running time: 82 minutes
- Country: United States
- Language: English

Traumatika is a 2024 American horror film directed by Pierre Tsigaridis. The film follows Mikey whose night terrors become reality when his mother begins showing signs of demonic possession.

The film premiered at the FrightFest on August 24, 2024, and was released in the United States on September 12, 2025.

== Cast ==
- Rebekah Kennedy as Abigail
- Ranen Navat as Mikey
- Emily Goss as Alice
- Susan Gayle Watts
- A.J. Bowen as Sheriff Miller
- Sean O'Bryan as John Reed
- Sean Whalen as Steve
- Maxime Rancon as Volpaazu

== Release ==
Traumatika premiered at the FrightFest on August 24, 2024. The film also premiered at the Grimmfest on October 5. In April 2025, Saban Films acquired North American distribution rights to the film, and released it in the United States on September 12.

== Reception ==
On the review aggregator website Rotten Tomatoes, 69% of 26 critics' reviews are positive, with an average rating of 5.9/10.

== See also ==
- List of horror films of 2024
