= House Hunting =

- Directed by: Eric Hurt
- Written by: Eric Hurt
- Produced by: Erica Arvold; Pat Cassidy
- Starring: Marc Singer; Art LaFleur; Hayley DuMond; Janey Gioiosa; Paul McGill; Rebekah Kennedy; Victoria Vance
- Cinematography: Todd Free; Eric Hurt
- Edited by: Jay Thomas; Eric Hurt
- Music by: Jaysen Lewis; Cody James
- Production companies: Pillage and Plunder Pictures
- Distributed by: Phase 4 Films
- Release date: November 3, 2012 (Virginia Film Festival)
- Running time: 102 minutes
- Country: United States
- Language: English

House Hunting (also released as The Wrong House) is a 2012 psychological horror-thriller film that was written and directed by Eric Hurt. The film had its world release on October 2, 2012 at the Virginia Film Festival, and received a DVD and VOD release through Phase 4 Films on March 5, 2013. The film stars Marc Singer and Art LaFleur and follows two families that are trapped within a deserted farmhouse.

== Plot ==
Charlie Hays, his daughter Emmy, and his second wife Susan follow a lead on a foreclosed house Charlie wants to buy. It's a seemingly perfect and beautiful home on 70 acres of private land. He also wants to use this as an opportunity for Emmy and Susan to get along, as neither likes the other. Meanwhile, another family – Don Thomson, his wife Leslie, and their live-in son Jason, who has suffered a broken leg in a car accident – meets a man in a red hat who gives Don an advertisement for the same house the Hayses are interested in. Finding it too good to be true, they too make the trip out to the house. Once both families arrive, they find the house abandoned. Charlie and his family go to the road to retrieve the realtor's phone number and, on the way back, nearly strike a distraught girl named Hanna running across the road. She is severely traumatized, and her tongue has been cut out. The families decide to take her to the hospital, but to their shock find themselves coming back to the house again and again. Don refuses to give up, but by nightfall, after passing the house 23 times, his car runs out of gas. They decide to stay in the house, despite Hanna's pleading not to enter.

Once inside, they find firewood and cans of stew that account for each one of them: seven cans for seven people. Despite the arguments that ensue between Leslie and Susan, the families decide to stay and wait for help. They remain for one month, while recordings on the house tell them that only one family will claim the house. Cabin fever and close quarters have everyone on edge until Susan spurns a cheerful Leslie for being too happy. As the tension mounts, the house inexplicably begins providing only six cans. Leslie starts seeing hallucinations of her daughter Lizzy, who had previously died and kills herself. After this, Susan learns that the house had been foreclosed on by Charlie himself, and Emmy begins seeing visions of a man who had killed his son. Soon after, Charlie and Emmy begin seeing visions of her mother, appearing before them with her throat slashed. Charlie confides in Emmy that her mother had left them long ago, but Susan seems to know more. Following clues from the mute girl Hanna and a jigsaw puzzle, Emmy nearly makes it back to the road by walking backwards, but she is interrupted by Jason, who tries to rape her. Hanna strikes him with a log, and he impales himself on a branch; Don, who is becoming increasingly paranoid, rescues him, but Jason begins to suffer shock from blood loss.

After being terrified by a vision, Jason admits to his father that he hit a jogging woman with his car, rather than a deer. It is revealed that she was an occupant of the house. Don leaves the Hayses bound and attempts to leave the property on his own. When he returns that night, he admits he reached the road and starts to free them, but Susan, fearing him, attacks and kills him with an axe. Afterward, the house stops providing food for them, and Charlie becomes erratic. At the house, the ghost of the woman Jason killed attacks him and chokes him to death. Charlie snaps after a vision of himself convinces him that Susan has told Emmy about his part in her mother's murder - in fact, Susan has told Emmy that it was a suicide. Suspecting Susan for stealing their food, he beats her to death with a stew can. Emmy and Hanna flee with him in pursuit, convinced that killing Hanna will allow them to leave. Charlie kills Hanna but is in turn shot by Emmy.

Finally making it to the road, Emmy comes across another family. They bring her into the car and drive back to the house. Emmy realises there are two families there to see the house and panics, but as they are distracted by the ghosts, she is pulled aside and her tongue cut out by the Realtor with a pair of scissors, and the cycle begins anew.

== Cast ==
- Paul McGill as Jason Thomson
- Marc Singer as Charlie Hays
- Art LaFleur as Don Thomson
- Hayley DuMond as Susan Hays
- Janey Gioiosa as Emmy Hays
- Rebekah Kennedy as Hanna
- Victoria Vance as Leslie Thomson
- Jon Cobb as the Realtor
- Emma Rayne Lyle as Lizzy Thomson

== Production ==
The filming took place in Charlottesville, Virginia over a 22-day period. Producer Erica Arvold became involved with the production and casting of the film after reading the first 30 pages of Hurt's script for House Hunting. Actress Janey Gioiosa was chosen to portray Emmy Hays, as she had previously performed in one of Hurt's earlier films and had impressed Hurt. Gioiosa sustained an injury during the filming of the movie, as she had burst a blood vessel in her eye during a scene that required she scream.

== Reception ==
Ain't It Cool News named the movie one of their "best horror films on AICN HORROR since last Halloween", as they felt that it was "original and well made". Starburst gave the movie 7 out of 10 stars and remarked that while the movie was "definitely not perfect" and would not appeal to all tastes, it was also "well made, compelling and interesting." Matthew Lee of Twitch Film wrote, "You have to forgive a lot to want to buy into The Wrong House, but it's still one of the best deals of 2012." In January 2013, Lee marked the film as one of his favorite films of 2012. In contrast, HorrorNews.net was more critical in their review and gave it a C+, praising the acting and directing while stating that the film's surrealism detracted from their viewing experience.
