= Blu de Golyer =

American writer and filmmaker

- Born: July 9, 1975 (age 50)
- Occupations: film producer, screenwriter
- Known for: House of Good and Evil, Hillbilly Horror Show

Blu de Golyer (born July 9, 1975) is an American writer and filmmaker. In 2013, Blu wrote and produced House of Good and Evil, starring Rachel Marie Lewis and German actor Christian Oliver. In 2014, he wrote and produced the Hillbilly Horror Show.

Blu has also produced the film Noah's Ark. Blu de Golyer is also a published author with his series of children's books The Adventures Of Captain Greenspud.

Blu de Golyer is the great nephew of stage actress Mary de Golyer (The Red Menace 1949). He is also related to oil tycoon Everette Lee DeGolyer.
