= Proxy (film) =

2013 American horror film directed by Zack Parker

- Theatrical release poster
- Directed by: Zack Parker
- Written by: Kevin Donner; Zack Parker
- Produced by: Faust Checho; Zack Parker
- Starring: Alexia Rasmussen; Alexa Havins; Kristina Klebe; Joe Swanberg
- Cinematography: Jim Timperman
- Edited by: Zack Parker
- Music by: The Newton Brothers
- Production companies: Along the Tracks; FSC Productions
- Distributed by: IFC Midnight
- Release dates: September 10, 2013 (TIFF); April 18, 2014 (U.S.)
- Running time: 120 minutes
- Country: United States
- Language: English

Proxy is a 2013 American horror film directed by Zack Parker, who co-wrote the screenplay with Kevin Donner. It stars Alexia Rasmussen, Alexa Havins, Kristina Klebe, and Joe Swanberg. The movie had its world premiere on September 10, 2013 at the Toronto International Film Festival. It stars Alexia Rasmussen as a pregnant young woman who joins a support group after suffering a stillbirth due to a vicious attack. The filmmakers describe Proxy as a spiritual successor to the horror film Rosemary's Baby, and its main character Esther Woodhouse is named after the earlier film's protagonist Rosemary Woodhouse.

Film rights to Proxy were picked up by IFC Midnight shortly after its premiere at the Toronto International Film Festival.

== Plot ==
While walking home from a doctor's appointment, heavily pregnant Esther Woodhouse is knocked unconscious by a person wearing a hoodie, who hits her stomach repeatedly with a brick. Despite the frantic efforts of emergency room doctors, her baby is delivered stillborn via caesarean section. Noticing that Esther doesn't seem to have any support from family or friends (the baby having been conceived with a sperm donor), a social worker at the hospital recommends that Esther attend a support group for grieving parents.

In the support group meetings, Esther meets and befriends Melanie Michaels, a woman who claims her husband and child were killed by a drunk driver. Later on, while visiting a department store, Esther sees Melanie walking in alone and suddenly start screaming that her son Peyton was kidnapped and begging a security guard for help. Esther follows Melanie to the parking lot and witnesses her taking Peyton out of her car and into the store. Esther smiles.

While Esther is home, her attacker suddenly appears and Esther is dragged from the kitchen. The two are shown having sex and it is revealed that the attacker is Anika Barön, Esther's lover who has performed the attack at Esther's request. Anika jealously inquires about Melanie, but Esther dismisses her.

Later, Esther invites Melanie to her home. Esther asks about Melanie's family and she sticks to her drunk-driver story. Esther says that she loved being pregnant because it made people pay attention to her, but that she never wanted to be a mother. She kisses Melanie, claiming that Melanie is the only person who understands her. Melanie rejects Esther, who reveals that she knows Peyton is alive. Melanie slaps Esther and demands that Esther never contact her again.

Esther takes Anika's truck and goes to Melanie's house. Sneaking in with a crowbar, Esther finds her husband Patrick is also alive. She evades Melanie and Patrick, finding Peyton in the bathroom and drowning him. Melanie enters and discovers his body. Distraught, she is startled by Esther and asks why she killed him. Esther claims that Melanie wanted him dead, and that they can now be together. Patrick returns with a shotgun and kills Esther. Anika, who'd been in jail during this time, learns of her death later and doesn't believe Esther did what they say, trying to find out the Michaels' identities to take revenge.

Days pass and the Michaels grieve. Melanie meets her friends for lunch, picks up Peyton's things from his school, and contacts a newspaper about her child's murder. Anika visits the newspaper in an attempt to find out who killed Esther, but is removed by their security. Later, Melanie breaks into Esther's house to retrieve the card with her number on it, where she observes Anika masturbating on Esther's bed. Patrick, however, seems unhinged. He is disgusted when Melanie suggests they can have another child and fantasizes about having left Esther alive so he could torture her. After noticing Anika's truck and the fact that it has not moved since the murder, he enters it and finds the registration. However, when he reports it to the police, he is told to stop since it would constitute theft. Patrick also starts attending a support group but finds out from a regular that his wife had been secretly attending for a year and that she had claimed Peyton was kidnapped. Patrick confronts Melanie about the support group and whether she knew Peyton's murderer. She denies everything and Patrick says he needs to leave her.

Anika finally finds the Michaels' whereabouts from the police informing her about her truck. She goes to the house, ties up Melanie and plans to wait for Patrick, so she can torture and kill them both. Melanie says that he is gone and probably isn't coming back but Anika hears running water from the bathroom and investigates, believing it is Patrick taking a shower. Instead, she finds him dead. Melanie breaks free and holds Anika at gunpoint and thanks her. Melanie fantasizes about being interviewed on TV two years later, having written a book about her experiences on having both her son and husband murdered by a deranged woman and her revenge-seeking lover, respectively, as well as advocating for child safety and self-defense and ending the interview by announcing that she has remarried and is now pregnant. Anika manages to grab a hammer while Melanie fires the shotgun.

== Cast ==
- Alexia Rasmussen as Esther Woodhouse
- Joe Swanberg as Patrick Michaels
- Alexa Havins as Melanie Michaels
- Kristina Klebe as Anika Barön
- Erika Hoveland as Mary Wilkens
- Faust Checho as Detective Allen
- Bruce Spielbauer as Marshall Michaels
- Xavier Parker as Peyton Michaels

== Reception ==
On the review aggregator website Rotten Tomatoes, 64% of 25 critics' reviews are positive. The website's consensus reads: "Proxy's ambitious reach slightly exceeds its grasp, but its subversive narrative and alluringly dreamlike aesthetic make this horror mystery hard to ignore." On Metacritic, the film has a weighted average score of 57 out of 100 based on 10 critics, which the site labels as "mixed or average" reviews.

Bloody Disgusting praised the film as "a joyfully trashy, sinful slice of macabre entertainment". Fangoria also gave a positive review, citing the suspense and acting as highlights. Shock Till You Drop gave a more mixed review, overall praising the film while stating that the second half of the movie "drags a little". Reviews from ReelFilm and the Toronto Standard were more negative, with the Toronto Standard remarking that while the film was a "valiant effort to copy [Hitchcock]", the movie may have been too ambitious for the budget and actors to live up to.
