= Her Dark Past =

- Written by: Blaine Chiappetta, Bonnie Hallman, Lyn Woodward
- Directed by: Kevin Shulman
- Starring: Kevin Ryan, JR Bourne, Kristina Klebe, Anna Lise Phillips
- Music by: Bret Domrose
- Country of origin: United States

Production
- Producer: MarVista Entertainment
- Cinematography: Jason Oldak
- Editor: Angel Gamboa
- Running time: 87 minunites

Original release
- Network: Lifetime
- Release: November 27, 2016

Her Dark Past is a film starring Anna Lise Phillips, Kevin Ryan, JR Bourne and Kristina Klebe. The film premiered on the Lifetime Network in 2016. The film was also marketed by the name The Many Faces of Alice in overseas territories.

The film centers around Alice, who is attacked. She wakes up with amnesia and with no memory of her past or her attacker. Alice must learn whom to trust and face the truth of who she really is.
