= House of Good and Evil =

- Film poster
- Directed by: David Mun
- Written by: Blu de Golyer
- Produced by: Blu de Golyer; Mark Rickard; Christian Oliver
- Starring: Rachel Marie Lewis; Christian Oliver; Bo Keister; Rob Neukirch; Jordan Rhodes; Marietta Marich
- Cinematography: Jared Noe
- Edited by: David Mun; Dan Graham
- Music by: Austin Creek
- Production companies: Shooting Creek Films; Horror Show
- Release date: April 27, 2013 (AIFF)
- Running time: 108 minutes
- Country: United States
- Language: English
- Budget: $150,000

House of Good and Evil is a 2013 American psychological thriller film directed by David Mun and written by Blu de Golyer. It stars Rachel Marie Lewis and Christian Oliver as a married couple who, after a miscarriage caused by the husband physically assaulting his wife during her pregnancy, decide to start over again by moving to a large, rural house without electricity or phone service. It was shot in Floyd County, Virginia, and initially screened there in June 2013.

== Plot ==
Maggie Conley has a miscarriage after an argument with her husband, Chris, turns physical. To save their marriage, they move to a large house in rural Virginia. They are met by a real estate agent, Rob Bradley, who explains that the house has been converted into a duplex. A quiet, elderly couple, the Andersons, rent the other half of the house. As constant storms have made public utilities prohibitively expensive, Bradley suggests that they use cell phones and a generator.

After showing them the house, Bradley comes upon a locked door and offers to return in a week with the key. Later, Chris refuses Maggie's offer to start the generator and insists on doing it himself. That night, Chris celebrates with mixed alcoholic drinks. Annoyed that he has resumed drinking, Maggie declines to join him in bed.

Maggie has a nightmare about the locked room involving vines connecting to her umbilical cord. After Chris drives into town for supplies, she forces her way into the room. She hears a loud ringing from a rotary-style telephone and she is frustrated when Chris reacts skeptically to her account. While they take a walk, he points out that the telephone lines are still down, and Maggie angrily accuses him of not supporting her. Tensions are further raised when Chris announces that he must leave the house for several days. Chris, a firefighter, explains that late fires have started in the nearby forest.

Because of the poor cell reception, Maggie is forced to travel to a clearing to use her cell phone, but is continually frightened away by strange noises in the trees. Maggie becomes increasingly agitated as she misses Chris' daily phone calls and continues to hear ringing from the Andersons' house. Maggie makes several unsuccessful attempts to meet the Andersons, only to meet Mr. Anderson one night after the generator stalls. Dressed in a nightgown and feeling vulnerable, she does not answer his double entendres as he restarts it for her. After she overhears Mrs. Anderson talking on the phone, she breaks into the Andersons' house; after she apologizes, the two chat.

Mrs. Anderson says that her husband is also a firefighter, though it is only a desk job due to his age and the lack of any recent fires. Already uncomfortable due to the previous revelation, Maggie leaves when her life and Mrs. Anderson's increasingly continue to mirror each other. Later, as the two take a walk together, Mrs. Anderson reveals that her husband beats her.

When Chris finally returns, Maggie confronts him in a rage, and he knocks her unconscious. Maggie accuses Chris of domestic violence, but he says that she was hysterical. At dinner, she and Chris get into another argument, and Maggie leaves the table as he shouts at her to sit back down. Quoting Mrs. Anderson, Maggie calls Chris a violent monster, and grabs an axe. Seeing this unfold outside, Mr. Anderson belittles Chris's manhood, and offers to kill Maggie.

Offended, Chris attacks Anderson, but Anderson fatally stabs him. Maggie kills Mr. Anderson with the axe and reconciles with Chris as he dies. She goes into the house, calling for Mrs. Anderson, who she saw through a window outside. A scream is heard from inside the house followed by repeated thuds. When Bradley returns, he finds the formerly locked room has been turned into a shrine to Maggie's lost baby, and Maggie is cuddling with Chris' decomposing corpse.

Later, the police explain that Maggie apparently went insane with grief after Chris choked on his own vomit the same night they arrived. The Andersons pull up in their car and reveal that they have only just arrived back from a vacation; Maggie imagined their presence.

== Cast ==
- Rachel Marie Lewis as Maggie Conley
- Christian Oliver as Chris Conley
- Rob Neukirch as Rob Bradley
- Jordan Rhodes as Mr. Anderson
- Marietta Marich as Mrs. Anderson
- Bo Keister as Sheriff Hanituski
- Blu de Golyer as Deputy Gardner

== Production ==
The film was shot over two weeks in 2012 in Floyd County, Virginia. Executive producer Susan Whalen de Golyer, wife of writer-producer Blu de Golyer, was born in Floyd County, which influenced their choice of where to shoot. Blu de Golyer praised Floyd County for its community spirit and said that, due to its low budget, the film could not have been made in Los Angeles. Bo Keister, who co-produced, ran an acting studio in a neighboring county. He chose the role of the sheriff when offered a speaking role. When he demonstrated knowledge of the area and was able to procure needed services, he was brought onto the production team. Originally, Tippi Hedren was slated to co-star and Clint Howard to direct. Howard pulled out when they could not raise a large enough budget. Three days before shooting began, Hedren was forced to cancel due to ill health. Marietta Marich was cast as Mrs. Anderson in her place. Star Rachel Marie Lewis contacted de Golyer directly after she saw the script breakdown. She said that she was drawn to Maggie's psychological journey.

== Release ==
It played at the Arizona International Film Festival on April 27, 2013. A free screening took place in Floyd County on June 29, 2013. It was released on video on demand on October 1, 2013, and a second screening took place in Roanoke, Virginia, on March 15, 2014. It had a limited theatrical release in late March 2014 and was released on DVD in the United States on April 1, 2014. It was released on DVD in the UK on May 12, 2014.

== Reception ==
Patrick Cooper of Bloody Disgusting rated it 3/5 stars and recommended it to fans of slow-burn psychological thrillers, though he said that it was overlong. Mark Bell of Film Threat rated it 3/5 stars and wrote that the film is "like a walk you've taken a couple times before, know all the landmarks, but wind up arriving somewhere completely different than where you thought you were heading." Influx Magazine rated it C+ and wrote, "Even with a story that we've seen many times before, the ending was, if nothing else, unexpected, but not everyone will be happy with the outcome." Tristan Bishop of Brutal as Hell called it dull, overlong, listlessly plotted and "almost entirely devoid of anything remotely exciting until the last ten minutes or so". Derek Anderson of Daily Dead rated it 3.5/5 stars and wrote that it is "worth checking out if you like psychological horror, haunted house thrillers, and even romantic dramas with a supernatural slant". Mark L. Miller of Ain't It Cool News called it "deeper and more complex than most haunted abode flicks".
