= Subject Two =

- Directed by: Philip Chidel
- Written by: Philip Chidel
- Produced by: Philip Chidel; Christian Oliver; Dean Stapleton
- Starring: Christian Oliver; Dean Stapleton
- Cinematography: Rich Confalone
- Edited by: Philip Chidel
- Music by: Erik Godal
- Release date: January 20, 2006 (Sundance Film Festival)
- Running time: 93 minutes
- Country: United States
- Language: English

Subject Two is a 2006 American film directed by Philip Chidel and starring Christian Oliver and Dean Stapleton.

== Plot ==
Adam, a medical student, is lured to a cabin far from civilization where he volunteers to be repeatedly killed and reanimated by Dr. Franklin Vick, through use of a mysterious serum. While "Subject Two" as he is initially successful, he begins to experience violent seizures and excruciating pain, begging Vick to kill him or committing suicide several times. Adam eventually gains complete immortality and near instantaneous regeneration, but as a consequence he loses the very sense of being alive; he can no longer feel things (including pain) and no longer can have emotions. His eyes turn snow white, and, to compensate for the gradual loss of his sense of self, he becomes violent and depressed, going so far as to kill a hunter that accidentally shoots him rather than risk him exposing the project. Eventually the student leaves Vick, only to become a walking ghost doomed to walk the earth for eternity. After returning home, "Vick" finds the real Dr. Franklin Vick, and it is revealed that the doctor for the course of the entire movie was his assistant, Subject One. Thinking that he had accidentally killed Dr. Vick, Subject One assumed his identity to continue the work, but finds that the serum was initially perfect, and it was only his tampering that gradually changed Adam. Dr. Vick scolds him before strangling him in a similar fashion to Adam, and thus begins the experiment cycle over again. It carries several obvious homages to Frankenstein but explores more the emotional effects of death and pseudo-life.
