= The Lord of the Rings: The Battle for Middle-earth =

2004 video game

The Lord of the Rings: The Battle for Middle-Earth
- Developer: EA Los Angeles
- Publisher: EA Games
- Directors: Chris Corry; Bing Gordon (creative)
- Designer: Dustin Browder
- Artist: Matt J. Britton
- Composers: Bill Brown; Jamie Christopherson
- Engine: SAGE
- Platform: Microsoft Windows
- Release: NA: December 6, 2004; UK: December 10, 2004
- Genre: Real-time strategy
- Modes: Single-player, multiplayer

The Lord of the Rings: The Battle for Middle-earth is a 2004 real-time strategy video game developed by EA Los Angeles for Microsoft Windows. The first part of the Middle-earth strategy game, It is based on Peter Jackson's The Lord of the Rings film trilogy, in turn based on J. R. R. Tolkien's original novel. The game uses short video clips from the movies and a number of the voice actors, including the hobbits and wizards. It uses the SAGE engine. The sequel, The Lord of the Rings: The Battle for Middle-earth II, was released on March 2, 2006.

The official game servers for The Battle for Middle-earth were permanently closed on December 31, 2010 by EA Games, due to the expiration of The Lord of the Rings video game license, however the players can still play it online using unofficial game servers.

== Gameplay ==
The Battle for Middle-earth is a real-time strategy game. Warring factions gather resources, then use them to construct military bases and armies on-site. In The Battle for Middle-earth, buildings may only be constructed on the building slots of predefined plots. Plots range from farmhouses to full-fledged castles, with different slot arrangements and available buildings, and plots can be purchased when they're in the sole presence of a side's forces. The only resource are the nebulous "resources," which are produced inexhaustibly in dedicated buildings. Four factions on two sides wage the War of the Ring: Representing the Free Peoples are the horse-lords of Rohan, and Gondor with its forges and battlements. The Forces of Darkness are the fighting Uruk-hai of Isengard, and Mordor's orc hordes, bolstered by Haradrim, Mûmakil, and Trolls.

Keeping with the trends of contemporary RTS titles, basic units operate in groups, significant characters are represented by "hero units", and the destruction of units gathers points for the purchase of special abilities. There is also a unit limit. Unit strengths and weaknesses form a sort of rock-paper-scissors system. Cavalry beats archers as they do not have a lot of time to shoot and are then forced to close quarters fighting, Pikemen beat cavalry, swordsmen beat pikemen and archers beat swordsmen. Fire beats Ents, Mûmakil, and Trolls. Units gain experience and levels, becoming hardier and more dangerous. Squads replace lost members when rank 2 or higher without losing experience.

Most normal units have purchasable upgrades and may also have abilities such as changing formation, changing weapons, combining with other squad types, Ranger stealth and orc cannibalism. Heroes are unique, far more potent units (and Hobbits and Gollum) that lack upgrades but do have multiple, elaborate abilities, and can be purchased back if killed. Most hero abilities require certain experience levels. Good has the advantage in the quantity and quality of heroes; Gandalf at the peak of his strength is an anti-army device. Buildings also gain experience and may become able to build new units, research new upgrades, or bestow better passive bonuses such as a reduction in cavalry build costs.

The player's special powers are purchased from a small tree. They can be utilitarian (Vision of the Palantír, reveals an area), supportive (Healing), or able to call in temporary units (Summon Eagles, Summon Balrog). They are usable indefinitely once acquired, with recharge times but no cost. Both factions on a side share the same powers, and the tree is much larger (and slower to climb) in campaign mode than it is in skirmishes. Good has some powers that boost the ability of a single hero (Power of the Istari, Andúril). Evil receives aid in resource harvesting (Industry, Fuel the Fires).

The Heroes for Gondor are Pippin, Faramir, Boromir, and Gandalf. Rohan's heroes are Merry, Éowyn, Éomer, Théoden, Gimli, Legolas, Aragorn, and Treebeard (he is bought at an Entmoot). Isengard's heroes are Lurtz and Saruman.

Mordor's heroes are Gollum, two Fell Beast-riding Ringwraiths (Nazgûl), and the Fell Beast-riding Witch-king of Angmar. Frodo, Sam and Shelob are playable at various stages of the good and evil campaigns, but cannot be used in skirmish battles.

Catapults firing on the walls of Minas Tirith

== Campaign ==
The good and evil forces of Middle-earth each have a campaign. They take place on an animated map of western Middle-earth, where each battle represents the defense/sacking of a territory. Armies and characters move on the map, and moving the cursor over them shows snippets of the movies (whereas battle cutscenes use the game engine).

Some mandatory missions represent important events. Between these the player must take enough nearby territories in skirmish battles, variations on the theme of building a base and killing everyone. Each territory provides a permanent increase of power points, the unit limit, and/or a multiplier for acquired resources. Units, their upgrades and purchased powers also persist between battles.

=== Good campaign ===
The good campaign follows the story of the Lord of the Rings movies with an emphasis of traditional, scripted missions, from Moria to Lórien, the fight at Amon Hen, the Battle of the Hornburg, the Ents' conquest of Isengard, the siege of Osgiliath, Sam's search for Frodo in Shelob's lair, the Battle of the Pelennor Fields and the Black Gate.

=== Evil campaign ===
The evil campaign begins with Isengard's betrayal and then continues with Saruman's conquest of Rohan signified by the fall of Helm's Deep and the deaths of Théoden and Éomer. It then switches to Mordor's assault on Gondor and concludes with the successful destruction of Minas Tirith and total victory for Sauron. It provides an alternative storyline to the book and film.

== Development ==
=== Music ===
The Battle for Middle-earth features score from The Lord of the Rings film trilogy composed by Howard Shore, as well as original music in Shore's image by Jamie Christopherson and Bill Brown. The Lord of the Rings: The Battle for Middle-earth (Soundtrack from the Video Game) was released via digital sellers on August 28, 2006, featuring 22 tracks of cues from the game by Christopherson & Brown spanning 44 minutes.

=== Working conditions ===
The development environment and "extreme crunch time" for The Battle for Middle-earth led to a high-profile labor lawsuit by programmers that was settled by Electronic Arts for US$14.9 million in 2006.

== Reception ==
Reception

Aggregate score
Aggregator	Score
Metacritic	82/100

Review scores
Publication	Score
Eurogamer	8/10
GamePro	4.5/5
GameRevolution	3.5/5
GameSpot	8.4/10
GameSpy	4/5
IGN	8.3/10

According to Electronic Arts, The Battle for Middle-earth was a commercial success, with sales above 1 million units worldwide by the end of 2004. In the United States, the computer version of The Battle for Middle-earth sold 230,000 copies and earned $9.4 million by August 2006, after its release in December 2004. It was the country's 89th best-selling computer game during this period. It received a "Gold" sales award from the Entertainment and Leisure Software Publishers Association (ELSPA), indicating sales of at least 200,000 copies in the United Kingdom.

The critical response to The Battle for Middle-earth was fairly positive. The video game review aggregator GameRankings displays an average critic score of 82.5%, with about two-thirds of the reviews in the 80%s. IGN praised the game for its visual flair and impressive audio, but pointed out its lack of depth in gameplay, giving out a score of 8.3 to the "decent, if not spectacular, game. GameSpot, with a score of 8.4, also commented on the visuals and sound effects as well as its focus on large-scale battles that "befits the source material". GameSpy gave 4 stars out of 5, calling the game "a perfect example of a license enhancing the final product."

=== Awards ===
The Battle for Middle-earth won three awards: the E3 2004 Game Critics Awards award for Best Strategy Game, the 2005 GIGA Games award for Best Strategy Game, and the GameSpy award for Best of E3 2004 Editors Choice.

The Battle for Middle-earth was nominated for X-Play's "Best Strategy Game" and PC Gamer US's "Best Real-Time Strategy Game 2004" awards, both of which ultimately went to Rome: Total War. It also received a runner-up placement for GameSpot's annual "Best Game Based on a TV or Film Property" prize. During the 8th Annual Interactive Achievement Awards, The Battle for Middle-earth received a nomination for "Strategy Game of the Year", which was ultimately awarded to Rome: Total War.
