= The Lord of the Rings: The Battle for Middle-earth II =

2006 real-time strategy game

- Developer: EA Los Angeles
- Publisher: Electronic Arts
- Director: Chris Corry
- Designer: Jason Bender
- Programmer: Martin Hoffesommer
- Artists: Matt J. Britton; Adam McCarthy
- Composers: Bill Brown; Jamie Christopherson
- Engine: SAGE
- Platforms: Microsoft Windows; Xbox 360
- Release: Windows: NA: February 28, 2006; UK: March 3, 2006; Xbox 360: NA: July 5, 2006; UK: July 14, 2006
- Genre: Real-time strategy
- Modes: Single-player, multiplayer

The Lord of the Rings: The Battle for Middle-earth II is a 2006 real-time strategy video game developed and published by Electronic Arts. The second part of the Middle-earth strategy game series, it is based on the fantasy novels The Lord of the Rings and The Hobbit by J. R. R. Tolkien and its live-action film series adaptation. It is the sequel to Electronic Arts' 2004 title The Lord of the Rings: The Battle for Middle-earth. Along with the standard edition, a Collector's Edition of the game was released, containing bonus material and a documentary about the game's development.

The story for The Battle for Middle-earth II is divided into Good and Evil Campaigns. The Good Campaign focuses on Glorfindel, an Elf who is alerted to a planned attack on the Elven sanctuary of Rivendell. With help from the Dwarves and other Good forces, the Elves attempt to eliminate Sauron and his army to restore peace in Middle-earth. In the Evil Campaign, Sauron sends the Mouth of Sauron and the Nazgûl to muster wild Goblins. With his army, Sauron moves forward with his plan to destroy the remaining Good forces in the North. The Windows version of the game was released in March 2006 and the Xbox 360 version was released in July 2006.

The Battle for Middle-earth II received generally favorable reviews from video game critics. Reviews praised the game's integration of the Lord of the Rings universe into a real-time strategy title, while criticism targeted the game's unbalanced multiplayer mode. The Battle for Middle-earth II received numerous awards, including the Editors' Choice Award from IGN. At the end of March 2006, The Battle for Middle-earth II reached fourth in a list of the month's best-selling PC games. A Windows expansion pack for the game was released in November 2006, called The Rise of the Witch-king, which features a new faction known as Angmar, new units, and several gameplay improvements. The official game servers were shut down for Windows in 2010 and Xbox 360 in 2011; however Windows users may still play online using unofficial game servers.

== Gameplay ==
The mini-map is shown in the bottom-left corner, while the player's hero units are shown in rows next to it. Gandalf is the selected hero; his abilities are seen next to his portrait.

The Battle for Middle-earth II is a real-time strategy game. Similar to its predecessor, the game requires that the player build a base with structures to produce units, gather resources, research upgrades, and provide defenses. Units are used to attack the enemy and defend the player's base. Players win matches by eliminating all enemy unit producing structures. Unlike the first game, the player can build an unlimited number of structures anywhere on the map, allowing for more freedom in base building and unit production. Players can build walls to defend their base; however, the walls can only be constructed within a certain proximity to the player's fortress. They can also construct arrow and catapult towers on building plots around a fortress to provide defensive support and basic protection. Along with this, each factions' fortress is uniquely equipped with a special power reached only by purchasing necessary upgrades. The game's HUD, called the Palantír, shows the player's hero units and their abilities, a mini-map, and objectives.

Units are classified into one of several classes: infantry, ranged, pikemen, cavalry, or siege. Each unit class has unique strengths and weaknesses, emphasizing the importance of properly matching up units in battle to increase their effectiveness. Hero units are unique in that only one of each can be created; they consist of characters from the novel, such as Aragorn, Legolas, Gimli, Saruman, Nazgûl, Mouth of Sauron, Arwen, the Witch-king of Angmar, and Shelob, characters created for the game like Gorkil the Goblin King and Drogoth the Dragon Lord, or are created via the game's Hero Creator (only accessible via the PC version). If the player kills Gollum, a non-player character, they are rewarded with the One Ring. The item can be used to summon one of two ring heroes for a price of 10,000 resources, Galadriel and Sauron, depending on the player's faction. Ring heroes have extremely strong armor and powerful attacks, making them among the game's most over-powered units.

The War of the Ring mode combines turn-based strategy elements with real-time skirmishes. Middle-earth is divided into territories; players can construct buildings to produce troops only in a claimed territory. During each turn, the player can move their armies into neutral and enemy territories to take control of them. While neutral territories are conquered by simply entering them, enemy territories must be wrested from the other player by defeating them in a skirmish. Troops can be garrisoned in conquered territories to defend against enemy attacks. When the player chooses to attack another territory, or one of their territories is being invaded by an enemy, they can either simulate the match and let the computer determine the outcome, or play the match by commanding the units in real time. The winner of the skirmish gains the territory, and all surviving units gain experience points. To win the game, players must either control the enemy's capital territory, or take over a given number of territories in Middle-earth.

The Battle for Middle-earth II introduces three new factions with unique units and heroes: Goblins, Dwarves, and Elves. Rohan and Gondor are combined into one faction called Men of the West. Along with Mordor and Isengard from the first game, there are six playable factions. The troops of Gondor provide a solid offense and defense with standard infantry and archers, and the Rohirrim of Rohan act as elite cavalry. The Elven archers are effective at inflicting damage from a distance, and their support units, the Ents, can perform a combination of melee and siege attacks, they are often considered the strongest defensive faction due to their strong missile units and powerful 'silverthorn arrows'. Although slow and expensive, Dwarven infantry, pikemen, and axe-throwers are very powerful and well-armored allowing them to prevail in even the longest clashes with enemy troops. A collection of wild creatures and beasts of Middle-earth make up the Goblin faction, this includes Goblins, Trolls (particularly Cave Trolls, Attack Trolls, Mountain Trolls, Drummer Trolls, and Half-Troll Marauders), Giant Spiders, Mountain Giants, Dragons, and Fire Drakes, which are effective in large numbers. Their only advantage is that the goblin archer and soldier units are cheap to make at only 75 resources and build faster than other basic infantry. Isengard troops are highly trained Uruk-hai under Saruman's command. Berserkers are used by Isengard as one-man armies that move extremely fast and deal significant damage (particularly to enemy buildings and heroes). Additionally, Isengard is the only Evil faction that can build walls. Mordor forces are a mixture of Orcs, Men, Trolls, Mûmakil, and Sauron's lieutenants. Mordor Orcs have tough armor, making them useful for absorbing enemy damage while stronger units attack enemies. Trolls contribute greatly to the Mordor offensives, having strong melee attacks and the ability to throw boulders or wield trees like swords.

== Plot ==
The game is set in the northern regions of Middle-earth, during the War of the Ring. For the sake of gameplay, the game takes several liberties with Tolkien's works and the film trilogy. Some characters were altered in their appearances, abilities, and roles; for instance, a combat role in the game is given to Tom Bombadil, a merry and mysterious hermit who appears in The Lord of the Rings but does not take part in the war. In addition, Tolkien's earlier novel The Hobbit lends several elements to the game, including characters such as the Giant Spiders from Mirkwood. The story for The Battle for Middle-earth II is divided into Good and Evil Campaigns. Both campaigns focus on the battles fought by the newly introduced factions: the Elves, Dwarves, and Goblins. The player goes through nine fixed missions on either Easy, Medium, or Hard difficulty mode. Narrated cutscenes provide plot exposition between missions.

=== Good Campaign ===
The Good Campaign opens after the Fellowship of the Ring has set out on their mission to unmake the One Ring of Power, with Elrond and Glóin planning the War in the North. The Elven hero Glorfindel discovers an impending attack on the Elven sanctuary of Rivendell. Thanks to the early warning, Elrond's forces in Rivendell manage to repel the Goblins' attacks. Following the battle, Elrond realizes that the Elves and Dwarves must join forces to purge the threat of Sauron's forces in the North.

The next battle takes place in the Goblin capital of Ettenmoors, where the Goblin fortress is destroyed and Gorkil the Goblin King is killed.

After their victory, the heroes are informed that the Goblins on Sauron's command enlisted the service of a Dragon named Drogoth who is laying waste to the Dwarves of the Blue Mountains. The heroes make their way to the Blue Mountains and help the Dwarven army defeat Drogoth and his Goblins.

The Grey Havens, an Elven port on the western shores, is attacked by the Corsairs of Umbar, allies of Sauron. The Dwarves, who have been reluctant to ally with the Elves, eventually decide to come to the aid of the Grey Havens. With the Goblins defeated and all of Eriador pacified, the Dwarven-Elven alliance is tested by Sauron's forces.

Mordor's overwhelming forces besiege the Lake Town of Esgaroth and the Dwarven city of Erebor. The Dwarven king Dáin leads a small group of Dwarves and men of Dale to defend their homeland and manage to eliminate the Mordor presence in Esgaroth but are forced to retreat back to Erebor to defend themselves against an overwhelming army led by the Mouth of Sauron. After a long battle against the Mouth of Sauron's army, Elven reinforcements from Mirkwood led by the Elven king Thranduil arrive and save the Dwarves, defeating the Mouth of Sauron and his army.

Elrond leads the first attack, but later, Thranduil, Glorfindel, Glóin, Arwen, and King Dáin all unite under the Dwarven-Elven alliance for a final battle in Dol Guldur, the stronghold of Sauron in Mirkwood, aided by the Ents and Eagles. The Good forces and their three combined armies overcome the defenses and destroy the fortress, eliminating the last threat in the North.

=== Evil Campaign ===
The Evil Campaign follows an alternative version of the War in the North.

Sauron sends the Mouth of Sauron and the Nazgûl to the North to muster wild Goblins. His lieutenants lead the Goblin army and the Trolls and launch an assault on the Elven forest of Lórien while freeing three trapped Mountain Giants. Despite heavy resistance, the forest is overrun with Celeborn slain and Galadriel having fled to Rivendell. Even Caras Galadhon collapses under the sheer force of the massive invasion. The Mouth of Sauron peers eagerly into the captured Mirror of Galadriel for his next attack as his Goblins celebrate their triumph over the Elves amidst the ruins of the once-mighty ancient stronghold.

Another group of Goblins led by the Goblin King Gorkil attacks the Grey Havens by land and sea. The Elven port is destroyed and captured, and the march across Eriador begins.

The Hobbits of the Shire are chosen as the next target. Gorkil's horde manages to crush the Hobbits and burn their country to the ground, but Saruman's servant Gríma Wormtongue suddenly appears with a large army of Isengard Uruks and claims the land for his master. The Goblins annihilate the well-trained army and kill Wormtongue, taking the Shire for themselves while enslaving the Hobbits.

Gorkil continues marching west and besieges Fornost, the fortified ruins of the ancient capitol of Arnor. The defenders, consisting of the Dúnedain and Dwarves led by Glóin, crumble under the relentless Goblin attacks, and Eriador falls under Goblin control.

Sauron launches a concurrent campaign east of the Misty Mountains. The orcs from Dol Guldur eliminate the Elves and the Ents that guard the Forest Road in Mirkwood, defeating the Elven lord Thranduil.

After the fall of Mirkwood, the Mouth of Sauron leads his horde to Withered Heath to recruit the Dragon Lord Drogoth after destroying the Dwarves in the area and freeing the captive Fire Drakes. The Mouth of Sauron wins Drogoth over by bringing some fire drakes that they freed from the Dwarves to him.

To finally rid Sauron and Middle Earth of the Dwarves, The Mouth of Sauron attacks the human city of Dale and the Dwarven stronghold of Erebor, led by King Dain.

For the final battle against the Good factions in the North, the Goblin horde and Sauron's forces from Mordor converge at Rivendell, the last surviving stronghold against Sauron in Middle-earth. Eagles, the Dead Men of Dunharrow, Galadriel and her surviving Elves, and the remnants of the Fellowship of the Ring arrive to help Arwen and Elrond, but Sauron (having attained full power through recovering the One Ring from the dead Frodo) and all his gathered forces of Goblins, Orcs, Trolls, Mountain giants, Spiders, Dragons, and Fellbeast enter the battle and completely destroy the remaining Good forces in the North. With Rivendell defeated, Sauron claims victory and darkness now falls all over Middle-earth.

== Development ==
Tolkien Enterprises granted the publisher of The Battle for Middle-earth II, Electronic Arts, the rights to develop The Lord of the Games video games based on The Lord of the Rings books on July 22, 2005. This agreement was complementary to a separate arrangement made between Electronic Arts and New Line Cinema in 2001. The earlier agreement only gave Electronic Arts the rights to build video games based on New Line's The Lord of the Rings film trilogy. The new deal gives Electronic Arts the opportunity to create video games with original stories tied closely with the Lord of the Rings universe. In the same announcement, Electronic Arts revealed two games that its EA Los Angeles division would be developing with the license: The Lord of the Rings: The Battle for Middle-earth II for Windows—a sequel to The Lord of the Rings: The Battle for Middle-earth—and The Lord of the Rings: Tactics for the PlayStation Portable.

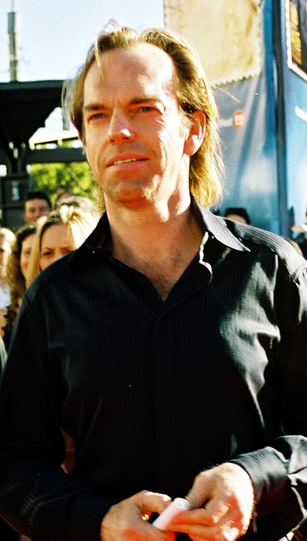
Hugo Weaving, who played Elrond in the Lord of the Rings film trilogy, reprised the role in The Battle for Middle-earth II, also acting as the lead voiceover.

On November 10, 2005, Electronic Arts announced that Hugo Weaving, who played Elrond in the Lord of the Rings film trilogy, would reprise his role as Elrond and be the lead voiceover talent in The Battle for Middle-earth II. During his voiceover session, he noted, "I always find voice work really fascinating because you are working on one element of your make up as an actor—focusing more intently on one part of your toolbox if you like—in a way so everything seems to go into producing that vocal effect. It really isn't just an effect, because it actually comes from a source which is a true continuation of that character."

On January 13, 2006, Electronic Arts reported that an Xbox 360 version of The Battle for Middle-earth II was under development, and it was promised to feature a "unique and intuitive control scheme" developed by video game designer Louis Castle, co-founder of the real-time strategy developer Westwood Studios. Players would be able to play online via the Xbox Live service. Castle was excited to port the game to a console, stating, "Living these cinematic battles in high-definition with stunning surround sound, all from the comfort of your living room couch on the Xbox 360, is an extraordinary experience. [...] Adding the ability to battle it out with friends via Xbox Live is also really exciting."

The game's water effects received substantial upgrades because of the large role naval battles play in The Battle for Middle-earth II. The developers endeavored to make the surface of oceans and lakes look realistic by using techniques similar to those applied in films when creating computer-generated ocean water. The digital water simulates deep ocean water by reflecting its surroundings on the surface, and wave technology was used to create large waves along coastlines to immerse the player in the game experience. Lost towns, corals, and fish were added underwater to add to the effect. Water was chosen as the first graphical component of The Battle for Middle-earth II to take advantage of DirectX 9 programmable shaders. These additions were part of an overall Electronic Arts strategy to continue the Lord of the Rings experience that began with the trilogy film series.

As cinematic director of The Battle for Middle-earth II, Richard Taylor was responsible for designing the game's opening and closing sequences, as well as campaign and mission introductions and endings. As the first Electronic Arts video game to be given free rein on material from The Lord of the Rings universe, several lands, characters, and creatures from the books appear visually for the first time in the game's cut scenes. Taylor considered it essential to use good graphical and audio combinations when telling a story, and he was pleased to have Weaving on the project as the primary storyteller.

== Release and reception ==
Reception

Aggregate score
Aggregator	Score
Metacritic	(PC) 84/100 (X360) 79/100

Review scores
Publication	Score
1Up.com	A−
Eurogamer	8/10
Game Informer	85%
GamePro	4.5/5
GameRevolution	B
GameSpot	8.3/10
GameSpy	3.5/5
GamesRadar+	9/10
GameZone	8.7/10 (PC); 8.5/10 (X360)
IGN	9.0/10
PC Gamer (UK)	80%
PC Gamer (US)	90%
PC Zone	7.1/10

The game was initially released by Electronic Arts for Windows in North America on February 28, 2006, and in the United Kingdom on March 3. It received a port for Xbox 360 in North America on July 5, and in the United Kingdom on July 14. Electronic Arts released a Collector's Edition that includes a bonus DVD with supplemental high-definition media such as the full original music score; in-game cinematics and trailers; the documentary The Making of The Battle for Middle-earth II; and The Art of the Game, a gallery featuring hundreds of cinematic paintings and concept art created for the game.

It was given generally favorable reviews, receiving an aggregated score of 84% at Metacritic for its Windows version. Praise focused on its successful integration of the Lord of the Rings franchise with the real-time strategy genre, while criticism targeted the game's unbalanced multiplayer mode. The Battle for Middle-earth II was given the Editor's Choice Award from IGN. At the end of its debut month of March 2006, The Battle for Middle-earth II reached fourth in a list of the month's best-selling PC games, while the Collector's Edition peaked at eighth place. In the second month after the game's release, The Battle for Middle-earth II was the 12th best-selling PC game, despite a 10% slump in overall game sales for that month. The game's computer version received a "Silver" sales award from the Entertainment and Leisure Software Publishers Association (ELSPA), indicating sales of at least 100,000 copies in the United Kingdom.

After playing the game, PC Gamer found little fault with it, calling it a very well-balanced game overall. The magazine also was pleased that the game's "production values [were] sky-high", with which GamesRadar agreed, explaining, "It's not often you come across an RTS with production values this high; every part seems to be polished till it shines." When compared to its predecessor, The Lord of the Rings: The Battle for Middle-earth, GamePro was convinced The Battle for Middle-earth II had improved upon the original in several fundamental ways. GameSpot believed that The Battle for Middle-earth II offered better gameplay and a much broader scope that encompassed more of Middle-earth.

Several critics praised the game's real-time strategy elements and graphics. IGN considered the high quality of The Battle for Middle-earth II proof that Electronic Arts was truly interested in building great real-time strategy games. Despite a few minor issues, GameZone was happy with the gameplay of The Battle for Middle-earth II, believing that the game did a good job of enabling the player to experience the turmoil of the fantasy world. They also admired the game's conversion for the Xbox 360 version, calling it "one of the best PC-to-console conversions" and praising the developers for a "commendable job of assigning actions to the 360 controller's eight buttons". The graphics were appreciated by ActionTrip, which found it "really hard not to drool over this game", commending the game's design and art team for doing a fabulous job on every location that appeared in the single-player campaign.

Playing within the universe of The Lord of the Rings was appealing to a number of reviewers, which found that it generally increased the game's entertainment value. PC Gamer shared this sentiment, calling Lord of the Rings "arguably the best fantasy universe ever", and GameZone asked the question, "What self-respecting Tolkien fan can be without this title?" The results also pleased 1UP.com, which was convinced that fans of The Lord of the Rings could not afford to miss purchasing the game. Game Revolution complimented the game's merge with the Lord of the Rings universe, observing that the franchise's mythology and the game's frenetic battles came together in a very satisfying bundle. The integration of The Lord of the Rings into a video game satisfied Game Informer, and the magazine predicted the game would be "another winner for Electronic Arts".

Despite positive reactions, reviewers brought up several issues with the game. The British video game publication PC Gamer UK was unhappy with the game, claiming that Electronic Arts chose to release a formulaic game because it was a safer choice than taking The Battle for Middle-earth II in another direction. PC Zone agreed with this view, claiming that although the game looked impressive, it took a by-the-numbers approach towards the real-time strategy genre in a "mindless sort of way", concluding that "in no way is it anywhere near the game we hoped for." The game's multiplayer portion disappointed GameSpy, which found it too unbalanced compared to the heroes, whom they considered to be too strong. Eurogamer considered the game to be of average quality, noting that there were no truly redeeming qualities.

The editors of Computer Games Magazine named The Battle for Middle-earth 2 the third-best computer game of 2006, and called it "undeniably a labor of love, a grand work of art and strategy."

The Smithsonian American Art Museum selected The Battle for Middle-earth 2 as one of 80 games spanning the past 40 years to be a part of The Art of Video Games exhibit that ran from March, 2012 to September 2012 in Washington, DC.

=== Post-release ===
Electronic Arts announced on July 27, 2006, that its EA Los Angeles studio would be releasing an expansion pack to The Battle for Middle-earth II titled The Lord of the Rings: The Battle for Middle-earth II: The Rise of the Witch-king. It was slated for release during the 2006 holiday season. The game, produced by Amir Rahimi, promised players the opportunity to fight in wars that precedes the events of the Lord of the Rings novels. The Rise of the Witch-king adds a new single-player campaign, new units, a new faction, and improved features. Its story follows the Witch-king of Angmar's "ascent to power, his domination of Angmar, and eventual invasion of Arnor, Aragorn's ancestral home". The game was sent to manufacturers on November 15, 2006, and was released on November 28.

On January 9, 2011, Electronic Arts announced that the online game servers would be shut down on January 11, 2011, for the Xbox 360 format of the game. The PC version of the game was shut down on December 31, 2010. Electronic Arts noted that their discontinuation of support for the game was partly because the licensing deal with New Line Cinema (holders of the Lord of the Rings license) had expired, which led them to no other option than to shut down all online services for the game.
