= The Lord of the Rings: The Battle for Middle-earth II: The Rise of the Witch-king =

2006 video game

- Developer(s): EA Los Angeles, BreakAway Games
- Publisher(s): Electronic Arts
- Director(s): Jill Eckhart
- Producer(s): Amir Rahimi
- Composer(s): Bill Brown; Jamie Christopherson
- Engine: SAGE
- Platform(s): Microsoft Windows
- Release: NA: November 28, 2006; PAL: November 30, 2006; UK: December 1, 2006
- Genre(s): Real-time strategy
- Mode(s): Single-player, multiplayer

The Lord of the Rings: The Battle for Middle-earth II: The Rise of the Witch-king is a real-time strategy video game published by Electronic Arts, based on the Lord of the Rings film series based on the book, directed by Peter Jackson. The Rise of the Witch-king is the expansion to The Lord of the Rings: The Battle for Middle-earth II, which was published by the same company and released in 2006, for Microsoft Windows. The Rise of the Witch-king was released on November 30, 2006.

== Gameplay changes ==
The game features a new faction, Angmar, bringing the total number of playable factions to seven. It also comes with a new campaign based on Angmar, consisting of eight missions telling the rise of the Witch-king of Angmar and the fall of the kingdom of Arnor. New units were added to all six existing factions, as well as both new and improved buildings and heroes. Every faction except Angmar also received an elite hero unit. Elite hero units have a small amount of health and deal a large amount of damage, but there are a small number of them in each battalion, and they only replenish their numbers at a healing structure. Major improvements were made to the War of the Ring mode, including army persistence from RTS mode to the World Map, the introduction of an economy to the World Map, and the introduction of siege weapons to the World Map. Fourteen new territories and battle maps were added, as well as a new region, the Forodwaith. Four hero armies were also made available per faction. The Rise of the Witch-king also added two new historical scenarios for the War of the Ring mode, including the Fall of Arnor and the War of the Ring. Create-A-Hero mode added two extra troll races, new weapons, and armor customization. Heroes were given a cost system tied to the number of powers given to them. Due to a license expiration, EA has shut down the online server as of January 2011. Today the community has moved to a new server through the downloadable program 'Game Ranger' where previous EA and new players continue to host & play on the official EA 2.01 patch.

== Plot ==
The campaign allows the player to command the army of Angmar from its foundation and early attacks against Arnor, to the destruction of Arnor at the battle of Fornost. The story for The Rise of the Witch-king draws a great deal upon the Appendices at the end of The Return of the King to form a basis for the conflict between Arnor and Angmar. Many of the notes that Tolkien made regarding the war are used as missions in the games campaign and epilogue. Although the game closely follows Tolkien's writing, some events are modified to suit the gameplay (such as the palantír of Amon Sûl being destroyed rather than brought to safety at Fornost), or are omitted altogether (such as the flight of King Arvedui from the defeat at Fornost).

=== Witch-king's conquest ===
Thousand years after Sauron was defeated by the last alliance of Men and Elves, the One Ring became lost and the Middle-Earth enjoyed a lengthy peace. The northern Kingdom of Arnor is ruled by Isildur's heirs through an uneasy alliance. After many years of infighting, Arnor is split into three Dunedain territories: Rhudaur, Cardolan and Arthedain. Exploiting the weakened state of the realms, Witch-King seeks to conquer them. Aided by his lieutenant Morgomir, he firstly takes the northernmost region of the Middle Earth, Angmar, by soliciting the troll Rogash and his brutes with promises of war spoils. He succeeds in conquering Angmar's capital Carn Dum and adds Black Numenorians to his ranks as well. Witch-King then sets his sight on Rhudaur, the weakest of the three Arnor territories, and conquers it with the aid of the brigand Hwaldar and hordes of lawless hillmen. Arnor's King Argeleb is killed in the battle, causing further discord and instability in the realm. Witch-King then attacks fortress of Amon Sul, an outpost hosting a Palantir and key position defending Fornost, the capital of Arthedain. He is successful in destroying the fort but Argeleb's son and heir, King Arveleg, flees the site with the Palantir. Angmar forces catch up to him but just as they are about to seize the Palantir, Arveleg smashes it into the ground, killing himself and everyone else in the vicinity in the ensuing explosion. Soon after, more Angmar forces arrive, led by Morgomir, and reclaim remaining shards of the Palantir.

Witch-King then sends Angmar army to Barrow Downs, the burial ground of Arnor Kings in Cardolan. There he provokes the defenders of the land and defeats them with the aid of Black Numenorian sorcerers, claiming all of Cardolan in the process. Witch-Kings conquest of Arnor quickly draws the attention of the Elves, who reform their alliance with Men and lay siege on his seat of power in Carn Dum. After a long and costly battle, Angmar triumphs, destroying the army of Men and Elves. In order to conquer Arthedain once and for all, Witch-King uses the sorcery forged from the remnants of the Amon Sul Palantir to spread a deadly plague into the last remaining realm of Arnor. Returning to Barrow Downs, the sorcerers corrupt the souls of fallen Arnorians, subvert and kill their leader Captain Carthaen and turn him into the undead servant Karsh. Finally laying siege to the capital of Fornost, the Witch-King overcomes their defenses and armies and destroys the fortress itself, effectively erasing the last remnant of the Arnorian Kingdom.

=== Epilogue ===
An epilogue mission allows the player to command the forces of Gondor and the Elves as they invade Angmar in retaliation for destroying Arnor. Elves led by Elrond and Glorfindel unite with Gondor's Earnur to strike at Carn Dum. Rogash, Karsh, Hwaldar and Morgomir are killed, Angmar's army is destroyed and Witch-King is forced into retreat. Earnur seeks to pursue him, but Glorfindel convinces him otherwise, foreshadowing that his death will come much later and not by a hand of man.

== Reception ==
Reception

Aggregate scores
Aggregator	Score
GameRankings	78%
Metacritic	78/100

The game received favorable reviews from critics. On the review aggregator GameRankings, the game had an average score of 78% based on 22 reviews. On Metacritic, the game had an average score of 78 out of 100 based on 22 reviews. NZGamer gave the expansion an 8.0 out of 10, crediting the games improvement of many aspects over the original Battle for Middle-earth, as well as the games campaign for its use of a lesser known part of Middle-earth's history.

The Academy of Interactive Arts & Sciences nominated The Rise of the Witch-king for "Strategy Game of the Year" at the 10th Annual Interactive Achievement Awards.
