= Tara Macken =

American stunt woman and actress

- Occupation(s): Stunt woman, actress
- Years active: 2008−present

Tara Macken is an American stunt woman and actress.

== Career ==
Macken has also been featured as an actress in the series Sons of Anarchy and Hawaii Five-O, among others. Additionally, she provided motion capture work for the 2012 video game Resident Evil: Operation Raccoon City.

Macken appeared in the 2012 film The Hunger Games as the District 4 tribute.
