= Kristina Klebe =

American actress

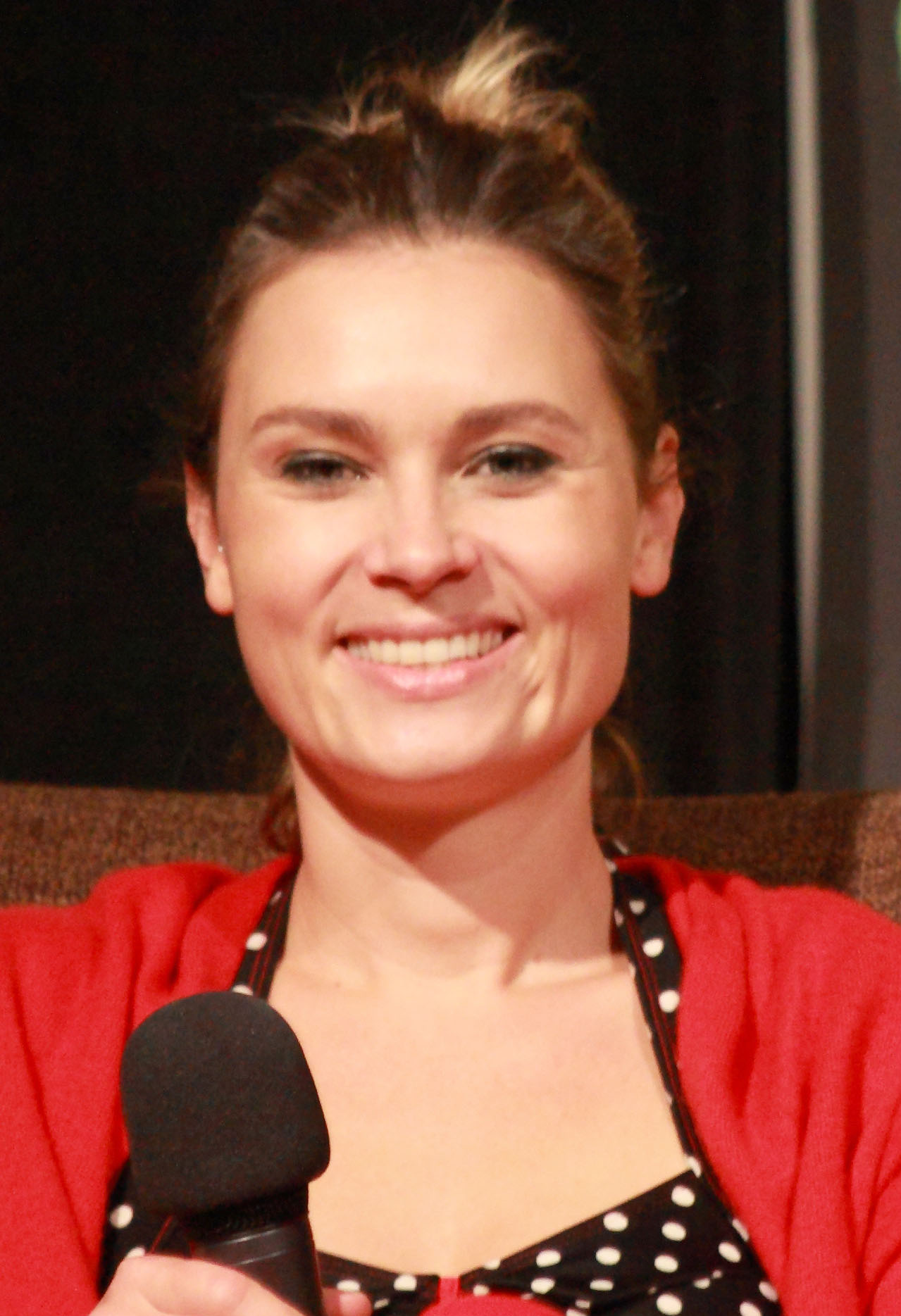
- Klebe at Spooky Empire in 2014
- Born: New York City, U.S.
- Education: Dartmouth College
- Occupations: Actress; producer; director; writer
- Years active: 2004–present

Kristina Klebe (/kliːb/ KLEEB) is an American actress, director, producer and writer. She came to prominence for her portrayal of Lynda Van Der Klok in Rob Zombie's Halloween (2007). Her other film roles include Proxy (2013), Neil Marshall's Hellboy (2019), and Two Witches (2021), which she also co-wrote.

== Early life ==
Klebe was born in New York City to European immigrant parents. Her father is from Germany.

Klebe went to high school in New York City and graduated from Dartmouth College in 2001 cum laude with a major in politics and a minor in theater and film. While in college, Klebe lived in Sienna, Italy when she was 20 for a study abroad program. She gave up being a competitive equestrian for a more complete immersion in theater in her teens. She attended the National Theater Institute at the Eugene O'Neill Theater Center in Waterford, Connecticut.

== Career ==
Her acting career began on several off-Broadway stages. Ranging from characters such as Juliet in "Romeo & Juliet," Beatrice in "The Servant of Two Masters," Dorimene in "The Bourgeois Gentleman," Mary in "On The Verge," and Jill in "The Big Funk," she has worked at Soho Rep, The Public Theater, NY Theater Workshop, 59E59, The Jean Cocteau Repertory and the Underwood Theater in New York.

Klebe was cast as Lynda Van Der Klok in Rob Zombie's Halloween (2007). She subsequently co-starred in the independent horror film Proxy (2013), and in the anthology film Tales of Halloween (2015).

In the mid-2010s, Klebe enrolled in the New York University Graduate Film Program at Tisch School of the Arts, where she wrote, directed, and acted in the short film Daddy's Little Girl as her thesis project, which was released in 2019.

She portrayed the historical character Leni Riefenstahl in Neil Marshall's remake of Hellboy (2019). Klebe had a leading role in the 2021 horror film Two Witches, which she co-wrote with director Pierre Tsigaridis. In 2024, she served as a jury member of the Compétition Cheval Noir award ceremony at the 28th Fantasia International Film Festival.

== Filmography ==
=== Film ===
Year	Title	Role	Notes
2004	She Hate Me	Ruth Lacey	
2006	Delirious	Nurse Kris	
2007	Blink	Sandra Miller	Short film
2007	Halloween	Lynda Van Der Klok	
2008	The Accidental Husband	Katerina Bollenbecker	
2008	To Be Continued	Sarah	Short film
2008	Love	Valerie	Short film
2008	Public Interest	Rita LaMontaine	
2009	Wild About Harry	Eliza Cauldicott	
2009	Peter and Vandy	Michelle	
2009	Zone of the Dead	Interpol Agent Mina Milius	
2010	Time to Meet	Victoria	Short film
2010	Na Zdorov 'Ya!	Nadya	Short film; also producer
2011	Buffy the Vampire Slayer: Season 8 Motion Comic	Rowena	Direct-to-video
2011	BreadCrumbs	Deputy Neilson	also co-producer
2011	Chillerama	Eva Braun	Segment: "The Diary Of Anne Frankenstein"
2011	6 Month Rule	Reese	
2012	Alter Egos	Ice Scream	
2012	Desperate Endeavors	Lambchop	
2012	White Elephants	Waitress	Short film; also thanks
2012	As Human as Animal	Karolyn	Short film; also executive producer, casting director, director, writer and editor
2013	Bela Kiss: Prologue	Julia	
2013	The Advocate	Allyson Dougherty	
2013	A Day in Eden	Nurse Anna	Short film; also casting director and special thanks
2013	Asenna	Asenna	Short film; also co-producer, casting director, stunt performer and costume designer
2013	Proxy	Anika Barön	
2014	Mamula	Kelly	also known as Nymph (Europe) / Killer Mermaid (USA); also stunt performer
2014	Kafka's The Burrow	Frau von Franz	
2014	Free Fall	Pam	
2015	Tales of Halloween	Detective McNally	Segment: "Bad Seed"
2015	Dementia	Michelle	also casting director
2016	Alleluia! The Devil's Carnival	Geraldine / His Lady Of Virtue	
2016	The Last Heist	Tracey	
2016	Don't Kill It	Agent Evelyn Pierce	
2017	Police State	Katie	
2017	Slay Belles	Alexi	
2019	Hellboy	Leni Riefenstahl	
2019	Daddy's Little Girl	Fiona	Short film; also writer and director
2020	I Am Fear	Sara Brown	also co-executive producer, casting director and second unit director
2020	Lucky	Marie	
2021	Two Witches	Rachel Howard	Also co-writer
2021	Not Alone	Dispatcher	
2021	Home Sweet Home Alone	Homebot	Voice role
2023	Brooklyn 45	Hildegard Baumann	

=== Television ===
Year	Title	Role	Notes
2004	St. Angela	Mel Davenport	Episode: "Kein Anfang ohne Abschied"
2005	Rescue Me	Mickey's Girlfriend	Guest role; 3 episodes
2005	Law & Order	Jill Dupree	Episode: "Ghosts"
2008	Law & Order: Special Victims Unit	Marga Janssen	Episode: "Lunacy"
2008	Bitter Brew	Shiovanna	Television film
2009	Criminal Minds	Miranda Dracar	Episode: "Outfoxed"
2010	CSI: Miami	Leslie Stoltz	Episode: "L.A."
2011	Scharfe Hunde	Kristina	Episode: "Pilot"
2013	Real Husbands of Hollywood	Anku Guttenstuf	Episode: "Auf Wiedersehen, Mitches"
2014	Katie Fforde: By Your Side	Client	Television film
2014	The Following	Carla	Guest role; 2 episodes
2014	Katie Fforde: Paradise Fields	Melissa	Television film
2015	Agent X	Zoya	Guest role; 2 episodes
2016	Katie Fforde: Summer of Witches	Jane	Television film
2016	Her Dark Past	Detective Martin	Television film
2017	NCIS	Navy Lieutenant Cheryl Dombrowski	Episode: "Nonstop"
2018	Das Joshua Profil	Irina Lewitsch	Television Film
2018	Professor T	Josephine Delius	Recurring role; 7 episodes
2019	Sinister Seduction	Sharon Elliott	Television film
2026	For All Mankind	Elena Beaufort	Recurring role; 6 episodes

=== Video games ===
Year	Title	Role	Notes	Source
2011	Rise of Nightmares	Mary	English version; voice role	
2017	Friday the 13th: The Game	Jenny Myers	Voice role	
2017	Wolfenstein II: The New Colossus	Frau Helene	Voice role	
2019	Anthem	Vara Brom	Voice role	
2020	Call of Duty: Black Ops Cold War	Various voices	Voice role	
2021	Tom Clancy's Rainbow Six Siege	Monika "IQ" Weiss	Voice role	
2023	The Texas Chain Saw Massacre	Sissy	Voice role	
2026	Halloween: The Game	Alexis Purcell	Voice role	
