= Christian Oliver =

German actor (1972–2024)

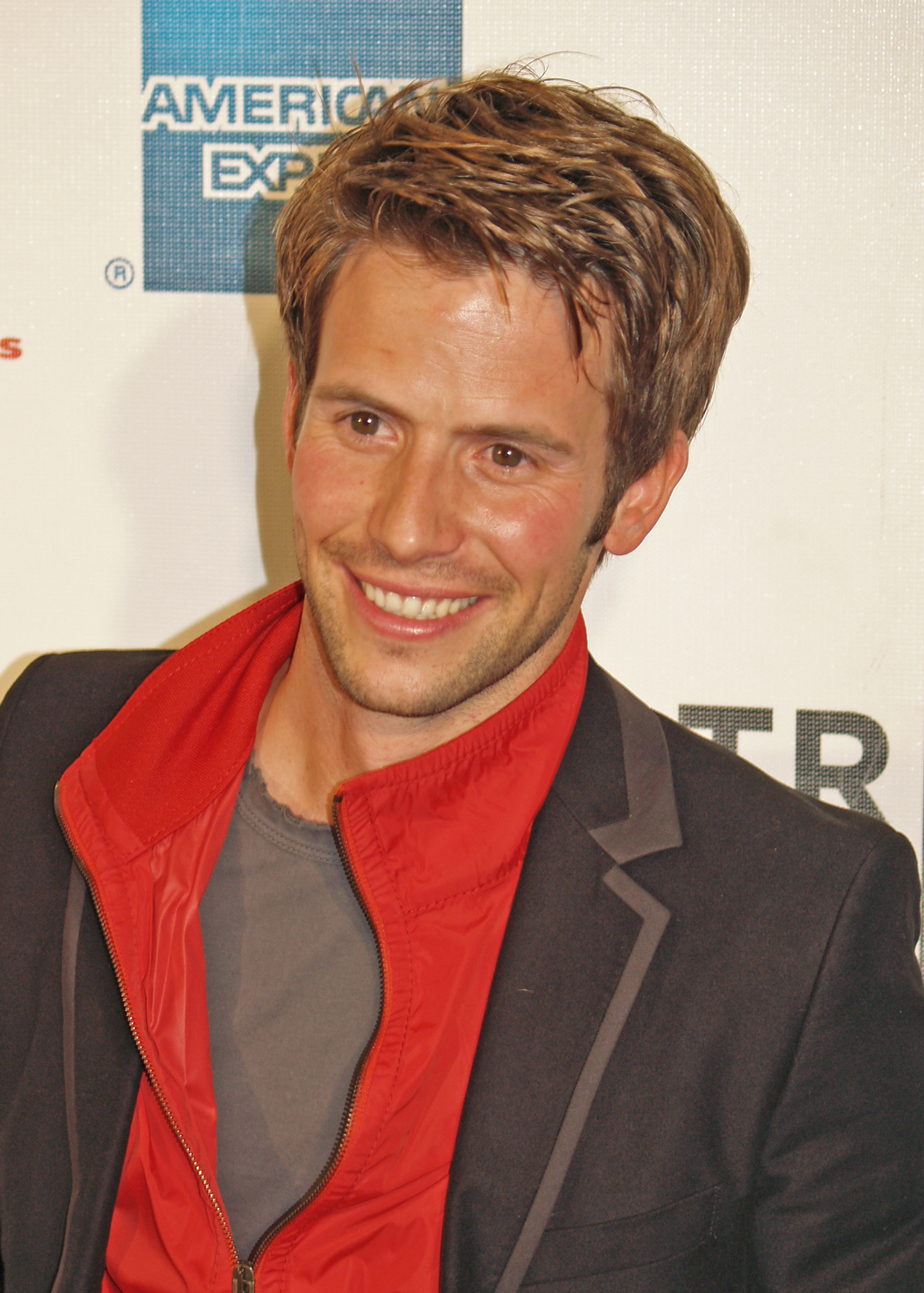
- Oliver at the Tribeca Film Festival in 2008
- Born: Christian Klepser; 3 March 1972; Celle, Lower Saxony, West Germany
- Died: 4 January 2024 (aged 51); Caribbean Sea (off the coast of Bequia, St. Vincent and the Grenadines)
- Years active: 1994–2024
- Spouse: Jessica Mazur (m. 2010; div. 2021)
- Children: 2 (both deceased)

Christian Oliver (3 March 1972 – 4 January 2024) was a German actor who was mainly known for his role in the Cobra 11 television series.

== Biography ==
Born Christian Klepser on 3 March 1972 in Celle, Oliver grew up in Frankfurt am Main, Germany. He relocated to the United States to work as a model and subsequently took acting lessons in New York and Los Angeles. From 2003 until 2004, Oliver co-starred in 28 episodes of the German action TV series Alarm für Cobra 11.

== Death ==
Oliver and his two daughters, Madita and Annik, were in a four-seater Bellanca Viking plane on 4 January 2024, when it crashed off the coast of Bequia after making a sharp turn to return to Bequia airport due to engine problems. The sharp turn caused the plane to stall and stopped the engine. Everyone on board, including the American pilot, Robert Sachs, was killed on impact. The crash is under investigation by the Royal St. Vincent and the Grenadines Police Force.

== Filmography ==
- Saved by the Bell: The New Class (1994–1995) — Brian Keller
- The Baby Sitters Club (1995) — Luca
- Two Sisters (1997) — Tim
- Eat Your Heart Out (1997) — Daniel Haus
- Bombs Under Berlin (1999) — Kalle
- Romantic Fighter (1999) — Dennis
- Schlaf mit meinem Mann (2001) — Benny
- Kept (2001) — Kyle
- Ablaze (2001) — Tim Vester
- A Light in the Forest (2002) — Gabriel Brown
- Frostbite (2004) — Hans
- Alarm für Cobra 11 — Die Autobahnpolizei (2003–2004) — Jan Richter
- Subject Two (2005) — Adam Schmidt
- The Good German (2006) — Emil Brandt
- Speed Racer (2008) — Snake Oiler
- Watercolors (2008) — High School Student
- Valkyrie (2009) — Sergeant-Major Adam
- Ready or Not (2009) — Chris
- Tribute (2009) — Steve Chensky (based on the novel by Nora Roberts)
- The Three Musketeers (2011) — Venetian Nobleman
- House of Good and Evil (2013) — Chris Conley
- Ninja Apocalypse (2014) — Cage
- Hercules Reborn (2014) — Arius
- Zipper (2015) — Max (uncredited)
- Sense8 (2015) — Steiner
- Master of Death (2015) — Ulrich Hemberger
- Timeless (2016) — Wernher von Braun
- Best Christmas Ball Ever (2019) — Lukas
- Hunters (2020) — Wilhelm Zuchs
- I Am Fear (2020) — Polo
- Indiana Jones and the Dial of Destiny (2023) — Voice actor
- Cruel Love (2026) — Ivan
