= Two Witches (film) =

- Promotional poster
- Directed by: Pierre Tsigaridis
- Screenplay by: Kristina Klebe; Maxime Rancon; Pierre Tsigaridis
- Produced by: Maxime Rancon
- Starring: Rebekah Kennedy; Kristina Klebe; Tim Fox; Dina Silva; Belle Adams
- Cinematography: Pierre Tsigaridis
- Edited by: Pierre Tsigaridis
- Music by: Gioacchino Marincola
- Production company: The Rancon Company
- Distributed by: Arrow Films
- Release date: October 1, 2021 (Salem, Massachusetts)
- Running time: 98 minutes
- Country: United States
- Language: English

Two Witches is a 2021 American horror film co-written and directed by Pierre Tsigaridis, and starring Rebekah Kennedy and Kristina Klebe. Klebe served as a co-writer alongside Maxime Rancon who also produced. The film tells two disparate but loosely-connected narratives focusing on a witch who intercedes in the lives of two women.

== Plot ==
Sarah Johnson, a pregnant young woman, goes out to dinner with her boyfriend, Simon. At the restaurant, she observes a strange elderly woman staring at her from an opposite table before peering at her through the window. Sarah is unnerved by the experience, and has several nightmarish visions of the woman after. Simon dismisses Sarah's fears as mere paranoia.

The couple visit their married friends, Melissa and Dustin, at their remote home in the country. Melissa, who has an interest in the occult, believes Sarah when she tells her that she fears the elderly woman is preying on her child, though Simon and Dustin are both skeptical. Later that night, after Melissa attempts to hold a group séance to banish the elderly woman from harming Sarah, the three find Sarah in a trancelike state. In the middle of the night, Sarah attacks Simon, seemingly possessed, and he barricades himself in the bathroom. In the bathtub, Simon sees the fetus of their unborn child, before having a nightmarish vision of the elderly woman. Melissa and Dustin attempt to open the bathroom door as Simon dies of a heart attack.

The next day, the elderly woman, seated in her home, listens to a radio broadcast about Sarah, who has gone missing, and Simon's death. The police have attributed the event to a case of domestic violence. As the elderly woman listens to the radio, she consumes a soup containing Sarah and Simon's unborn fetus. A clawed and black-cloaked figure rests its hands on her shoulders as she does so.

Sometime later in the same community, an eccentric young woman, Masha, has sex with a man she just met. When Masha's face grossly distorts during their sexual encounter, the man punches her in the face. The commotion alarms her roommate Rachel, a local museum director, who forces him out of the house. Rachel shares with Masha her own story about an abusive relationship she had with her former fiancé. Masha confides in Rachel that she believes she will inherit the supernatural powers her grandmother—the same woman who appeared to Sarah—possesses once her grandmother dies. The next day, Masha visits Rachel's office, but the receptionist informs her Rachel is at lunch. Masha relays to the receptionist what occurred the night before, co-opting details Rachel had described of her own relationship, and presenting them as her own. Rachel confronts Masha about this, but she seems impervious. Rachel, who is planning to visit her family for Christmas, tells Masha she wants her to move out while Rachel is away.

That night, Masha's grandmother dies in her home, and Masha simultaneously becomes possessed. Masha crashes a local Christmas house party, which Dustin and Melissa, still reeling from Simon's death, also happen to be attending. Masha violently attacks a female party guest in the bathroom, and Dustin overhears her repeating a strange mantra, the same one he heard Sarah repeating the night she disappeared. Outside, as Dustin explains the incident to Melissa, Melissa is hit and killed by a passing motorist. The next morning, upon news of Melissa's death, Rachel reveals she was a friend of hers.

On Christmas Eve, Rachel's mother Mary awaits her arrival, and is confused when Masha appears at her door, claiming that Rachel is en route, and that Rachel invited her because she had no one to celebrate the holiday with. When Mary lets her in, Masha presents her with a gift of a live rabbit, which she claims is Rachel, therianthropized. When a disturbed Mary orders Masha to leave, Masha breaks the rabbit's neck and throws it under the dining table. When Mary looks beneath the table, she sees the dead body of Rachel. Mary flees into the garage, only to witness an apparition of Masha's grandmother, who forces Mary to stab herself to death.

Rachel's boyfriend Charlie arrives at the house, and is attacked and restrained by Masha with her supernatural powers. Dustin arrives unexpectedly and douses Masha with gasoline before lighting her on fire. Masha, severely burned, awakens in her grandmother's house surrounded by several other witches. Her grandmother's corpse lies in a chair in the room. The witches invoke the devil, who appears in the room, ordering the witches to "bow to their new queen".

Some time later, a raving Sarah, finally discovered by authorities, is interviewed by a detective, and claims a witch ate her baby. When the lights go out, Masha's grandmother appears as Sarah laughs hysterically.

== Cast ==
- Rebekah Kennedy as Masha
- Kristina Klebe as Rachel Howard
- Tim Fox as Dustin Green
- Dina Silva as Melissa Green
- Belle Adams as Sarah Johnson
- Danielle Kennedy as Mary
- Ian Michaels as Simon Fleming
- Marina Parodi as the Boogeywoman
- Clint Hummel as Charlie
- Rachel Kerbs as Jessica

== Release ==
Two Witches screened at the Salem, Massachusetts Horror Film Festival on October 1, 2021.

The film was released on Blu-ray by Arrow Films on October 18, 2022.

== Reception ==
On the internet review aggregator Rotten Tomatoes, the film holds a 91% approval rating based on 22 reviews.

Leslie Felperin of The Guardian gave the film a mixed review, writing that although actress Rebekah Kennedy's "crazed smile buoys the back half of the film considerably, it’s all pretty episodic and blurry."
