= Carter Wilson =

American author (born 1970)

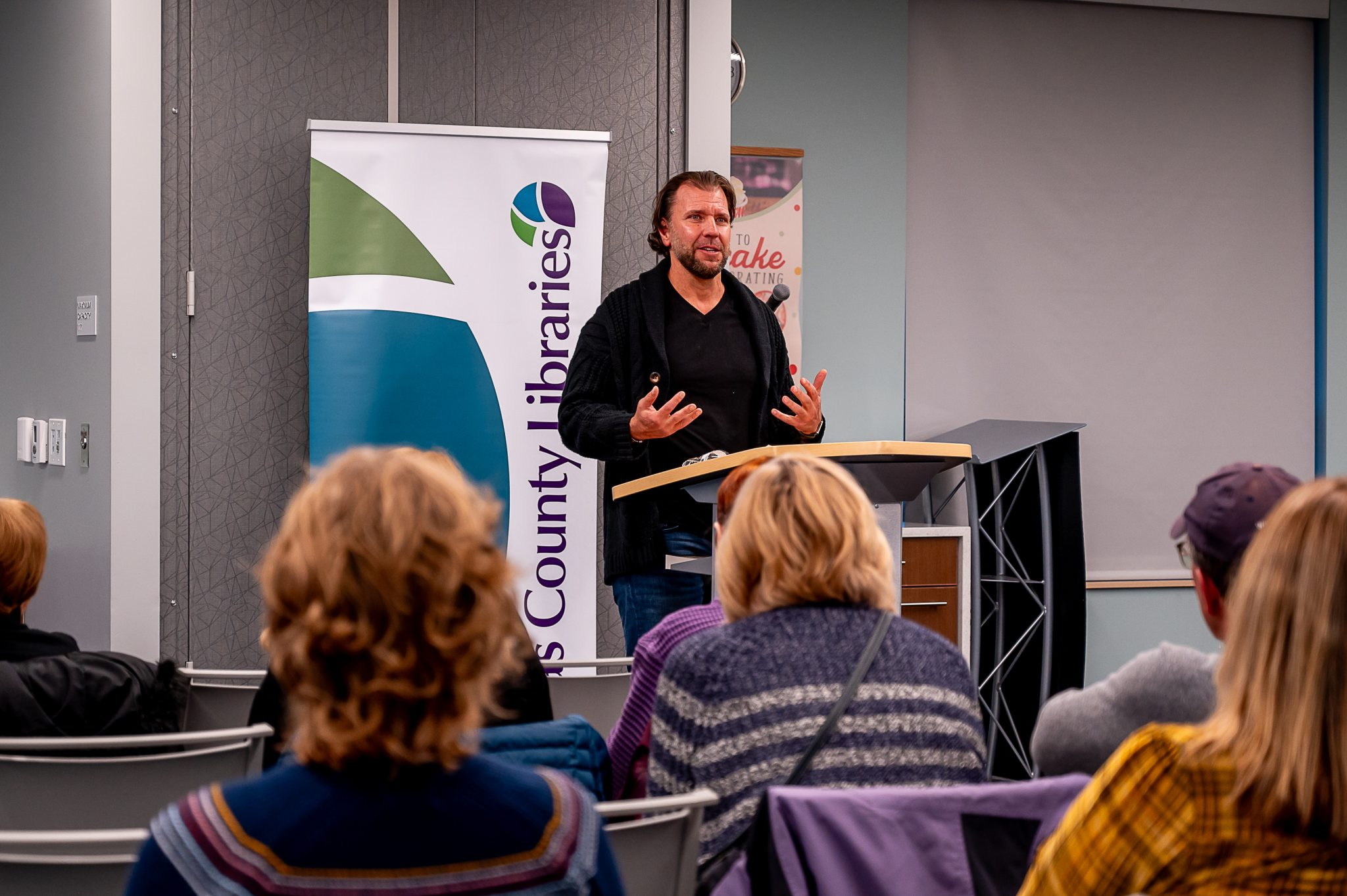
- Carter Wilson in April 2024
- Born: 1970 (age 55–56); New Mexico, U.S.
- Education: Cornell University (BS)
- Occupations: Novelist; Essayist; Short-fiction writer
- Writing career
- Period: 2003–present
- Genres: psychological thriller, suspense
- Website: carterwilson.com

Carter Wilson (born 1970) is an American novelist, essayist, and short-fiction writer based in Erie, Colorado. He is best known for his works of domestic and psychological suspense. Wilson is an author of ten books.

== Biography ==
Wilson was born in New Mexico and grew up in Los Angeles, California. He attended Cornell University in New York, where he received his B.S. degree in 1992. Since 1996, Wilson has been living with his family in Boulder, Colorado metropolitan area.

== Literary career ==
Wilson began writing in 2003. His first novel Final Crossing was published in 2012. Wilson's third novel, The Comfort of Black, made the USA Today bestseller chart, and won several book awards and nominations, including Colorado Book Award in the Thriller category. His works have been noted and reviewed by various publications and literary critics, including Kirkus Reviews, Publishers Weekly, Library Journal, and The Denver Post, among others. Two of his novels take place in the fictional town of Bury, NH.

Wilson also hosts the Making It Up video podcast in which he and other writers discuss the craft of writing and their publishing experiences.

== Published works ==
- Final Crossing (2012)
- The Boy in the Woods (2014)
- The Comfort of Black (2015)
- Revelation (2017)
- Mister Tender's Girl (2018)
- The Dead Girl in 2A (2019)
- The Dead Husband (2021)
- The New Neighbor (2022)
- The Father She Went to Find (2024)
- Tell Me What You Did (2025)

== Translations ==
- German translations: Revelation (Das Letzte Bekenntnis), The Comfort of Black (Das Dunkel der Shuld)
- Polish translations: The Comfort of Black (Pokusa Czerni), The Boy in the Woods (Chlopiec w lesie)
- Czech translations: The Boy in the Woods (Chlapec v lese)

== Literary awards ==
- Colorado Book Awards winner in 2016, 2017, 2019, 2020, and 2022.
- International Thriller Writers Awards 2019 nomination in the “Best Paperback Original Novel” category.
