= Project G.e.e.K.e.R. =

1996 American animated TV series

- Genre: Action; Adventure; Comedy; Science fiction
- Created by: Douglas TenNapel; Doug Langdale
- Voices of: Billy West; Cree Summer; Brad Garrett; Jim Cummings; Charlie Adler
- Theme music composer: Terry Scott Taylor
- Composer: Shawn Patterson
- Country of origin: United States
- Original language: English
- No. of seasons: 1
- No. of episodes: 13

Production
- Executive producers: Douglas TenNapel; Doug Langdale
- Producer: Audu Paden
- Running time: 22 minutes
- Production companies: Doug²; Adelaide Productions; Columbia TriStar Television

Original release
- Network: CBS
- Release: September 14 – December 7, 1996

Related
- Earthworm Jim; Catscratch; The Weekenders; Dave the Barbarian; Phineas and Ferb

Project G.e.e.K.e.R. is an animated television series that premiered on CBS on September 14, 1996. It was created by Douglas TenNapel, creator of Earthworm Jim, and Doug Langdale, the developer of Earthworm Jim the animated series, and was a production of Columbia TriStar Television under Adelaide Productions, with original music by Shawn Patterson and the main title theme composed by Terry Scott Taylor. TenNapel and Taylor also collaborated on the video games The Neverhood, Boombots and Skullmonkeys, and in 2005, re-united for the Nickelodeon cartoon Catscratch.

The show was cancelled after only one season, as CBS cancelled all of their Saturday morning schedule in 1997 to stop their downward-spiraling ratings.

The Federal Communications Commission also rejected CBS's attempt to classify the show as educational and informational under that fall's strengthened requirements for children's programming.

== Synopsis ==
The titular character, Project GKR (Geno-Kinetic Research), is an artificial shapeshifting being created by Mister Moloch and Dr. Maston of Moloch Industries and intended to be used as a weapon. However, the cyborg Lady MacBeth and her Tyrannosaurus rex companion Noah rescue him before he can be finished, leaving him with low intelligence and little control of his powers. The three must work together to evade capture and prevent Moloch from re-obtaining GeeKeR.

== Cast ==
=== Main cast ===
- Billy West as G.e.e.K.e.R., additional voices
- Cree Summer as Lady MacBeth, Nanny, Sonny, additional voices
- Charles Adler as Dr. Maston, Jake Dragonn, Gene Damage, additional voices
- Jim Cummings as Mister Moloch, Will Dragonn, Cosmotto, additional voices
- Brad Garrett as Noah, Captain Wormhole

=== Additional voices ===
- Danny Mann as Redjack
- Ed Gilbert as Dinosaur Leader
- Jeff Bennett as Larry the Virus
- Charity James
- Kath Soucie
- Dee Dee Rescher as Female Junker
- Joe Alaskey
- Jason Marsden as Kid Dinosaur
- Kevin Michael Richardson as Stonebender/"Mr. Smiley", additional voices
- Joe Lala
- Michael Bell as Toxic Moose
- Lisa Kaplan

== Episodes ==
No.	Title	Directed by	Written by	Original release date
1	"Destruct Sequence"	Audu Paden	Doug Langdale	September 14, 1996
Premiere Episode. After stealing GeeKeR from Dr. Maston, GeeKeR's self-destruct mode initiates, a feature Dr. Maston put in to keep him from falling into the wrong hands. Becky and Noah have no choice but to seek Maston's help to save his life.
2	"In Space, No One Can Hear You Sneeze"	Rafael Rosado	Doug Langdale	September 21, 1996
GeeKeR, Becky and Noah go into hiding on Space Station Zebra, but Mister Moloch sends his most insidious operative, Larry the Virus, after them. Larry uses his mind-control abilities to manipulate everyone on the station into attacking GeeKeR.
3	"Nightmare Park"	Llyn Hunter	Doug Langdale	September 28, 1996
GeeKeR, Becky and Noah are on the run from the Junkers, bio-engineered street thugs hired by Mister Moloch. The chase leads them into Nightmare Park, an abandoned amusement park full of still-functioning systems which are programmed to respond to any aggressive act with deadly combat games. Becky must control her raging temper or the park's mechanisms will destroy them all.
4	"Geekasaurus"	Toshiyuki Hiruma	Jan Strnad	October 5, 1996
When GeeKeR morphs into a dinosaur and finds himself unable to change back, Noah must hide him in Dinopolis, a hidden city of dinosaurs where no humans are allowed. But this brings the wrath of Mister Moloch down on dinosaurs everywhere, and soon Noah must choose between protecting his friend and saving his people.
5	"Smell of the Wild"	Rafael Rosado	Richard Stanley	October 12, 1996
GeeKeR starts emitting a hideous stench which draws an attack from Mister Moloch's goons, as well as the ire of Becky and Noah. Feeling rejected by his friends, GeeKeR runs away to the Wildlife Refuge, declaring that "animals like stinky things." But in the Refuge, GeeKeR faces a danger even greater than Mister Moloch: hordes of mutant animals led by the mighty Toxic Moose.
6	"23"	Audu Paden	Doug Langdale	October 19, 1996
Doctor Maston finally succeeds in creating another artificial human, GKR 23. GKR 23, equipped with a computer brain, is even more powerful than GeeKeR. 23 soon breaks free of Mister Moloch's control and sets out to destroy all humanity and repopulate the earth with superior, artificial beings like himself. Now it is up to GeeKeR to defeat the virtually indestructible 23.
7	"Thing Called Love"	Llyn Hunter	Richard Stanley	October 26, 1996
GeeKeR experiences love at last, falling hard for Sirena, a tentacled alien woman. Becky is suspicious; it seems as if this alien has some strange power over men. But even when it becomes obvious that Sirena is working for Mister Moloch, GeeKeR refuses to abandon his "true love" and walks willingly into Moloch's clutches. Can GeeKeR break the chains of love and do the right thing?
8	"In the GeeK of the Night"	Audu Paden	Jan Strnad	November 2, 1996
Due to being affected by a satellite signal, GeeKeR periodically transforms into a monster while sleepwalking and wreaks havoc on Neo-Denaire. This forces him to stay awake to avoid transforming, which causes troubling sleep deprivation-induced hallucinations.
9	"Independence Daze"	Toshiyuki Hiruma	Richard Stanley	November 9, 1996
Mister Moloch sets hundreds of ravenous, mechanical Cyberplants loose on Neo-Denaire to capture GeeKeR and his friends. When Becky and Noah are captured, the fuzz-brained GeeKeR must prove that he can be independent and track them down by himself.
10	"Worm"	Rafael Rosado	Thomas Hart	November 16, 1996
GeeKeR gets a pet alien worm, which Becky cannot stand and ultimately has him release it into a series of underground tunnels. In this environment, it grows to an enormous size, and Moloch uses it to track down GeeKeR. Soon, both GeeKeR and Noah are captured, and the only way Becky can save them is to overcome her revulsion and team up with the worm.
11	"Noble Savage"	Llyn Hunter and Audu Paden	Jan Strnad	November 23, 1996
Doctor Maston implants a tracer in Noah so that Mister Moloch can track him and capture GeeKeR. However, this affects his brain and gradually causes him to lose his intelligence. Noah soon goes off on a berserk rampage, and Becky and GeeKeR have to track him down.
12	"GeeKMan"	Audu Paden and Rafael Rosado	Doug Langdale	November 30, 1996
GeeKeR gets hold of a bunch of old comic books and decides that the best way for him to be accepted by normal people is to become a superhero. Donning a garish costume with huge inflatable muscles, he becomes GeeKMan, Champion of Justice. Unfortunately, "GeeKMan's" rather destructive heroics turn the people of Neo-Denaire against him.
13	"Future Shocked"	Rafael Rosado	Doug Langdale	December 7, 1996
GeeKeR, Becky and Noah travel a hundred years into the future and discover that Mister Moloch has gained control of GeeKeR and used his powers to conquer the galaxy. An elderly, imprisoned Noah gives them a few murky tips on how to foil Moloch's plan, and they return to the present to fight a seemingly doomed battle to change the course of history and save the galaxy.

== Credits ==
- Executive producers: Douglas TenNapel and Douglas Langdale
- Supervising producer: Richard Raynis
- Producer: Audu Paden
- Associate producers: Monique Beatty and Greg Chalekian
- Production coordinator: Luke Wasserman
- Original music: Shawn Patterson
- Theme song: Terry Scott Taylor
- Color designer: Don W. Kim
- Music editor: Bradford Cox
- Dialogue editor: Thomas Kearney
- Digital compositor (Opening Titles): Andy Jolliff
- Background designers: Vince Toyama and David James
- Storyboard revisor: Charles Garcia
- Dialogue director: Ginny McSwain

== Music ==
Terry Scott Taylor (friend of creator Doug TenNapel) was contracted to write the main title theme for the show, while Shawn Patterson was selected to be the series score composer. Two days before the show was set to air, Columbia TriStar discovered a licensing issue with Taylor, and Patterson was asked by the producers to compose and produce a main title theme to go on the air. Shawn completed this and Project GeeKeR aired with Patterson's original main title music. Weeks into the series, the licensing problem with Taylor was cleared up and TenNapel requested that Taylor's original main title theme be reinserted into the series. Patterson's main title music was then removed from the remainder of the series.

== See also ==
- Earthworm Jim
- The Weekenders
- Dave the Barbarian
- Catscratch
- Doug TenNapel
- Doug Langdale
- Sony Pictures Entertainment
