= Mark Lorenzen =

American video game designer (born 1965)

Mark Lorenzen (born 1965) is a video game designer and entrepreneur.

== Biography ==
Lorenzen was born in Virginia. He got primary education from Huntington Beach High School, and later attended Point Loma Nazarene University, finishing with a bachelor's degree in Visual Art.

== Career ==
Lorenzen first entered the video game industry by joining Blue Sky Software in the early 90s. While there, he served as design director on such games as Jurassic Park, Vectorman and Ren & Stimpy: Stimpy's Invention.

After leaving Blue Sky in 1995 Lorenzen joined Shiny Entertainment, working on Earthworm Jim 2. One of the levels he designed was named "Lorenzen's Soil" in his honor.

In 1996 a handful of Shiny members formed The Neverhood, Inc. (further history could be read here). The Neverhood included Mark's brother Tim, who worked at 7th Level. Lorenzen later led art design on The Neverhood, Inc.-made Skullmonkeys, and programming on BoomBots.

In 1999 The Neverhood, Inc. disbanded, and Lorenzen with four partners formed the game company Monkeytropolis, based in Rancho Santa Margarita, California. The company was active for 3 years, working on various projects, both internal and for outside publishers. Monkeytropolis disbanded in 2002.

In April 2002, Lorenzen joined Electronic Arts, to work as software engineer on various real-time strategy games such as Command & Conquer: Generals and The Lord of the Rings: The Battle for Middle-earth.

In 2005, Lorenzen moved to Utah, working for EA Salt Lake on Tiger Woods PGA Tour 07, Nerf N-Strike Elite and on various titles in the Electronic Arts The Sims 3 franchise.

In January 2014, Pencil Test Studios announced that Lorenzen was working as the lead programmer on their upcoming Armikrog game.

In 2015, Lorenzen was hired at GALXYZ Inc. as principal designer and developer of a Science Education app called Blue Apprentice.

in 2017, Lorenzen served as senior 3D developer at Telltale Games.

== Game credits ==
Name	Year	Credited With	Publisher
The Ren & Stimpy Show: Stimpy's Invention	1993	artist	Sega
Jurassic Park	1993	artist	Sega
Jurassic Park: Rampage Edition	1994	designer, artist	Sega
Desert Demolition	1995	artist	Sega
Vectorman	1995	designer, artist	Sega
Gargoyles	1995	artist	Buena Vista Interactive
Earthworm Jim 2	1995	lead artist	Playmates Interactive Entertainment
The Neverhood	1996	artist, writer, voice actor	DreamWorks Interactive
Skullmonkeys	1998	lead artist	Electronic Arts
BoomBots	1999	programmer, voice actor	SouthPeak Interactive
Command & Conquer: Generals	2003	programmer	Electronic Arts
Command & Conquer: Generals – Zero Hour	2003	programmer	Electronic Arts
The Lord of the Rings: The Battle for Middle-earth	2004	programmer	Electronic Arts
The Lord of the Rings: The Battle for Middle-earth II	2006	programmer	Electronic Arts
Tiger Woods PGA Tour 07	2006	programmer	Electronic Arts
Nerf N-Strike Elite	2009	programmer	Electronic Arts
Armikrog	2015	designer, programmer	Versus Evil

== Personal life ==
Mark Lorenzen is married to Jodi Lorenzen. He is based in Utah.
