= Science fiction Western =

Fiction genre

A science fiction Western is a subgenre or cross-genre that uses traditional Western plots and settings, while incorporating science fiction elements such as futuristic technology or aliens. The post-apocalyptic Western and steampunk Western fall within this subgenre.

Since the characteristic elements of science fiction can occur in any setting, science fiction lends itself to combination with other genres. In 1953, J. B. Priestley described the "Western" as one of the three types of science fiction.

Precursors of the science fiction Western are seen in 19th century inventor fiction such as The Steam Man of the Prairies (1868).

The film serial The Phantom Empire has been cited as possibly the earliest science fiction Western. Set on a dude ranch and making use of props associated with conventional Westerns, it showcased futuristic technology not in existence during the period. Since then, science fiction Westerns have appeared in film, television, novels, comic books, and other media.

== Setting and themes ==
In 1953, J. B. Priestley described the "Western" as one of the three types of science fiction. The separate genres of science fiction and Westerns use similar plot devices and character types, as well as common frontier settings and themes of survival, making the two genres well suited to be a blended subgenre. The shared setting of the frontier is a contrast with the typical Western showing the frontier as something that can be tamed, but something that can never be fully crossed in science fiction. Another shared theme is that force is often applied as a means of survival, leading to a type of hero that is often both savage and civilized at once. Also typical of both genres is the theme of an economic motive for exploration or expansion.

When combined, the science fiction Western focuses on traditional Western plots and frontier settings combined with science fiction elements, such as futuristic technology or aliens. This definition can be contrasted with the space Western, which, having its roots in science fiction, contains elements of the Western genre, but is generally in an outer space setting.

Related cross-over genres include Western steampunk, which typically include Western settings and futuristic science fiction elements combined with steampunk aesthetics. This may include cross-over with the Weird West genre. The post-apocalyptic Western falls within this subgenre, usually incorporating the lawlessness of the frontier, gangs of outlaws, and the survival of an alienated hero.

== History ==
The precursors of science fiction Western began as early as the late 1800s with what became known as inventor fiction, with examples such as The Steam Man of the Prairies (1868).

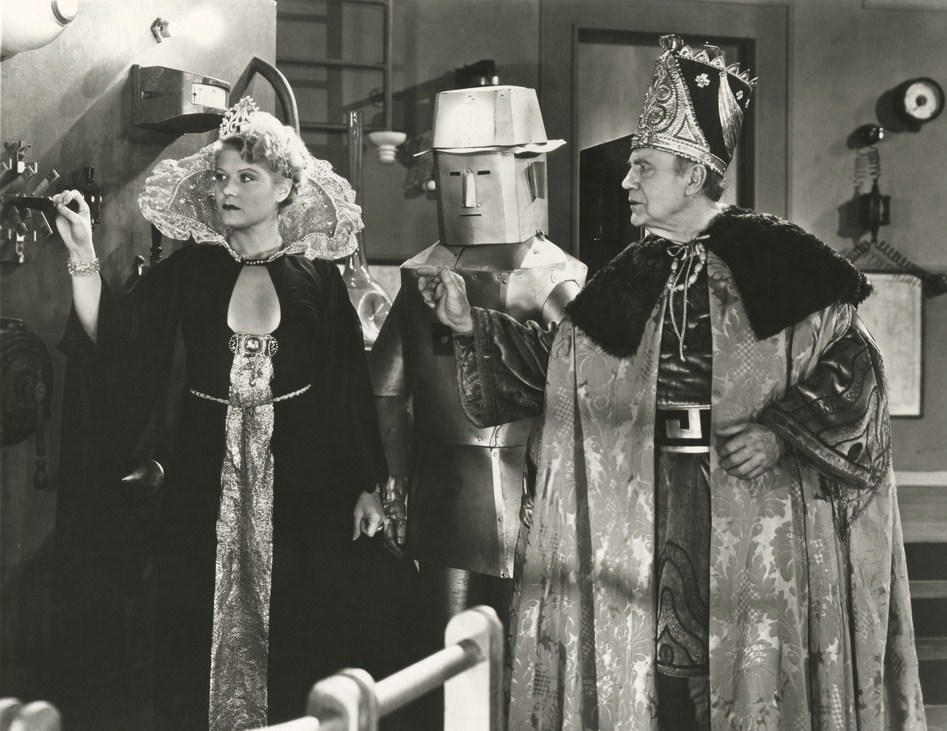
The Phantom Empire (1935) publicity still

Early serial films such The Phantom Empire (1935) and Ghost Patrol (1936) incorporated supernatural figures of science fiction fantasy into a Western setting. By the post-World War II era, Westerns began to fall out of favor in the youth market as space fever began to take hold. The classic Western's approach to gender, race, sexuality, and indigenous groups contributed to its decline until the hybrid Western revived it.

During the 1960s, films such as Valley of the Gwangi (1969), which displayed cowboys fighting dinosaurs, took hold. By the 1990s, The Adventures of Brisco County Jr. brought the science fiction Western into television mainstream.

The 2002 television series Firefly is considered to be distinctive. In one sense, it is considered a space Western with its outer space setting. However, its frontier realism qualifies it as a science fiction Western by others, including creator Joss Whedon, since it combined the visual elements associated with Westerns. In either case, it ultimately pushed the boundaries of genres. Whedon noted that the term made people "cringe".

Although a box office flop, 2011's Cowboys and Aliens paid homage to the genre with its successful integration of Western and science-fiction themes.

== Examples ==
=== Novels and stories ===
Lone Star Planet by John J. McGuire (1958) and Six-Gun Planet by John Jakes (1970) are examples of science fiction that pays particular attention to Western themes and are by writers not typically associated with the Western genre. Each is an example that defines the contrast between science fiction and Western genres. The frontier in science fiction is continuously expanding, while the Western frontier is limited and can be (or is) tamed. Both Lone Star Planet and Six-Gun Planet take place within a closed frontier, emphasizing the Western part of this hybrid genre.

In a setting that shares the social characteristics of American Old West, Stephen King's The Dark Tower series blends themes from multiple genres including science fiction Western complete with gunslinger protagonist Roland Deschain inspired by the Man with No Name.

The Buntline Special (2010) is the first book in a series by Mike Resnick that can be classified as weird Western or steampunk Western, a crossover genre of the science fiction Western.

Another example of the genre is The Ghosts of Watt O'Hugh by Steven S. Drachman (2011). Kirkus Reviews called it "a dime novel for modern intellectuals" that had "the fleeting pace found in many of the historic Western pulps authored in the 1800s".

=== Comics ===
Cowboys & Aliens by Scott Mitchell Rosenberg is a blend of science fiction and Western genres in which aliens crash their space ship in the Old West. Cowboys and Indians fight each other using the alien technology, but are eventually forced to work together to fight the aliens who have returned to retrieve their ship.

East of West by Jonathan Hickman and Nick Dragotta is a serial comic series in the science fiction Western genre set in a dystopian version of the United States in which Death, one of the apocalyptic characters of the Four Horsemen is the hero of the story.

An example within the steampunk Western subgenre is Iron West by Doug Tennapel, a story set in the American Old West, but with robots.

=== Films ===
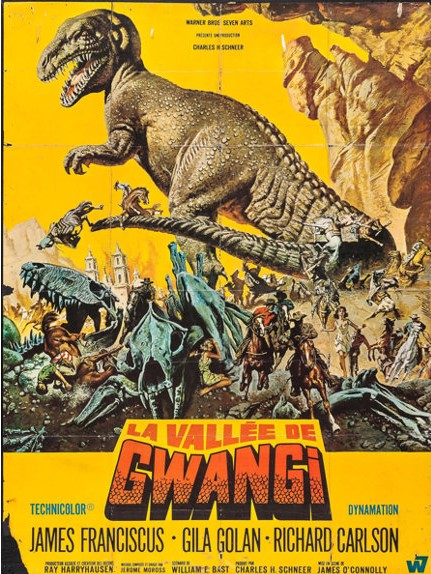
The Valley of Gwangi featured cowboys fighting dinosaurs

Early serial films such The Phantom Empire (1935) and Ghost Patrol (1936) incorporated supernatural figures of science fiction fantasy into a Western setting.

In another example of crossover subgenres, fantasy science fiction Western The Valley of Gwangi (1969) which displayed cowboys fighting dinosaurs, a trend that took hold during the 1960s.

Time-traveling 20th century heroes had to adapt to the Old West in Timerider: The Adventure of Lyle Swann (1982) and Back to the Future Part III (1990)

Wild Wild West (1999) expanded on the television series of the 1960s in a steampunk version of the Old West.

The Postman (1997) explored the post-apocalyptic Western style using the frontier setting and the "Man with No Name" archetype.

=== Television ===
The Wild Wild West is a television series that ran on CBS for four seasons from September 17, 1965, to April 11, 1969. Developed at a time when the television Western was losing ground to the spy genre, this show was conceived by its creator, Michael Garrison, as "James Bond on horseback." Set during the administration of President Ulysses Grant (1869–1877), the series followed Secret Service agents James West (Robert Conrad) and Artemus Gordon (Ross Martin) as they solved crimes, protected the President, and foiled the plans of megalomaniacal villains to take over part or all of the United States. The show featured a number of fantasy elements, such as the technologically advanced devices used by the agents and their adversaries.

Westworld (2016) is a HBO series based on a film of the same name made in 1973 written by Michael Crichton. The story centers on a futuristic Western-themed resort populated by highly realistic androids who believe it is real.

The Gunfighters (1966) is a four episode Doctor Who serial set in and around the town of Tombstone, Arizona, in the Wild West. In the serial, the First Doctor (William Hartnell) and his travelling companions Steven Taylor (Peter Purves) and Dodo Chaplet (Jackie Lane) get themselves involved with the events leading up to the Gunfight at the O.K. Corral.

Outlaws (1986) brought the concept of time travel into sci-fi Western television.

The Adventures of Brisco County Jr. (1993) brought the science fiction Western into television mainstream.

The Grimm Variations (2024), a Netflix anthology series retellings the fairy tales of the Brothers Grimm, uses a sci-fi Western setting for the episode "The Town Musicians of Bremen".

=== Other media ===
The role playing game Deadlands is an example of how the Western blurs genre boundaries. It uses the spaghetti Western as a game setting, and incorporates alternative history, horror, and the science fiction steampunk subgenre.

The science fiction Western subgenre has been used in the video game industry as well, with titles such as Tin Star (1994, Super NES), Wild Guns (Ditto) and Wild Arms (1996, PlayStation). Darkwatch (2005, PlayStation, Xbox) is an example of the steampunk Western subgenre.

The Nerf line of toys, 'Zombie Strike', falls under this category.

== See also ==
- List of Western subgenres
- Cross-genre
- Weird West
- Space Western
- Steampunk
