= Creature Tech =

- Cover of Creature Tech TPB
- Date: February 2003
- Publisher: Top Shelf Productions

Creative team
- Writers: Doug TenNapel
- Artists: Doug TenNapel
- Pencillers: Doug TenNapel

Creature Tech is a graphic novel, written and penciled by Doug TenNapel and published by Top Shelf Productions. Elements of the story tie in with TenNapel's previous comic book work Gear.

== Plot ==
The book tells of the adventures of Dr. Michael Ong, a paranormal scientist and former seminarian, who is assigned by the United States government to a head researcher's position at an Area 51-esque laboratory in his hometown of Turlock, California, called Research Technical Institute. In exchange for granting the government the lease to build the facility, the City of Turlock demanded for it to be staffed primarily by locals. Ong's task is to open the hundreds of crates in the facility's warehouse, then to catalog and classify the items in each crate. Many of these artifacts are proven to be highly dangerous and thoroughly insane, as they all cover a wide range from Russian teleportation technology to aliens and mutants, even a were-pig. As such, the town nicknames the facility "Creature Tech".

During what is just another ordinary day at the office, the ghost of the evil Dr. Jameson looses a slug-beast from its stasis capsule. Jameson was killed a century prior, after making a deal with a demon named Hellcat in exchange for the power to bring a "giant space eel" to Earth. Jameson succeeded a little too thoroughly, and he was crushed when the eel crash-landed into gold-rush-era Turlock.

The ghost of Dr. Jameson, generations later, seeks an artifact in one of the crates at Creature Tech, the authentic Shroud of Turin, and released the slug-beast in order to distract the facility staff to abscond with the shroud. During the ensuing battle, Ong is stabbed through the heart by a parasite attached to the slug-beast. The parasite detaches itself from the beast and attaches to Ong's chest, replacing his heart, but creating a permanent symbiosis.

Using the Shroud, Jameson resurrects his old body and begins a search for the remains of the space eel that killed him, so that he can resurrect it and use its power to destroy the world. In the meantime, he uses his demonic powers to unleash an army of demon-possessed cats upon Turlock. It's a race against time as Ong, the parasite on his chest, the human residents of Turlock and the monsters of Creature Tech defend their town against the demon onslaught and attempt to stop Jameson from destroying the world.

== Response ==
Creature Tech has received generally positive reviews. Publishers Weekly said "TenNapel's creativity and attention to detail fill this book with pleasant surprises and entertaining twists." Ain't It Cool News comic book editor Moriarty spoke well of the story, saying it is better than that of films like Shrek, The Iron Giant and Toy Story 2. And a review in Booklist said that TenNapel's cartooning talent "makes a winner out of this crazed romp."

== Film adaptation ==
20th Century Fox and Regency Enterprises obtained the rights to a feature film adaptation around the same time as publication, though the current state of those rights is unknown and no substantial production news has surfaced since 2002. At least some script work for a film adaptation was done by Andy Cosby.
