= Sockbaby =

- Promotional poster
- Written by: John Soares; Doug TenNapel
- Directed by: John Soares; Doug TenNapel
- Starring: John Soares; Cody Spurlock; Uriel Padilla; Justin Spurlock; Doug TenNapel; Jon Heder; Dan Heder; Isaac C. Singleton Jr. Rob Schrab; Kate Freund; Doug Jones
- Country of origin: United States
- Original language: English

Production
- Producer: John Soares
- Cinematography: Justin Spurlock
- Editor: John Soares
- Running time: 20 minutes
- Production company: Westhavenbrook Productions

Sockbaby is a four-part martial arts / comedy short film co-directed by Doug TenNapel and John Soares. Sockbaby originally premiered on Channel 101 (created by Rob Schrab and Dan Harmon) on January 25, 2004.

Sockbaby follows Ronnie Cordova, Burger, and Sockbaby as they battle Davis the Grey, Chum-Chum, Lord Opticord, The Manitou Frogmen, and Doug Jones in a spoof of 1970s Hong Kong cinema, comic book superheroes, blaxploitation films, and interdimensional monsters.

== Plot ==
=== Episode 1 ===
As Ronnie, Burger, and Sockbaby leave their house to go someplace to food up, they are confronted by Davis the Grey (a white faced demon in a black suit), who wants to take Sockbaby to Lord Opticord, leader of the Greys. Davis informs Ronnie that this Sockbaby is "the Sockbaby Jesus, Sock-savior to the Sock-people". While Burger escapes with the Sockbaby, Davis, and Ronnie fight each other, with Davis running off as he is defeated.

At its Channel 101 screening on Sunday, January 25, 2004, it received an audience share of 45.5% and was the 5th top-voted show with 129 votes.

=== Episode 2 ===
While Ronnie and Burger try to get their car started – Ronnie left the radio running, thus draining the battery – Lord Opticord dispatches more Greys to kill Ronnie and retrieve Sockbaby, including an ultra-powerful and poorly wardrobed club-wielding, two ton chum-chum. Ronnie once again manages to fight off a majority of the Greys, this time using even more spectacular fighting moves than before (utilizing a plasma pill), but he is eventually knocked down by the chum-chum.

At its Channel 101 screening on Monday, March 1, 2004, it received an Audience share of 39.7% and was the 7th top-voted show with 105 votes, leading to its cancellation.

=== Episode 3 ===
Burger dispatches an odd-looking creature to kill the chum-chum, and Ronnie rises again to defeat the remaining Greys, excluding Davis. Directly afterward he steps in a pile of dog feces, which he wipes from his shoe with a sock, tossing the sock on the ground. He then kills Davis for good, but discovers that Davis has killed Burger. Lord Opticord then confronts Ronnie directly. Opticord and Ronnie fight each other, during which Ronnie's funky disco medallion ties itself around both Ronnie's and Opticord's necks, putting both of them in an electric choke hold. While they are being choked, Opticord reveals to Ronnie what Opticord thought was the Sockbaby in his possession, but is actually Ronnie's discarded sock. Both Ronnie and Opticord then fall to the ground, dead. A shark robot then arrives, resurrecting Ronnie and leaving with the Sockbaby. Ronnie then finds that Burger has been revived as well, and together they leave to find some food.

=== Episode 4 ===

2008 / 11 mins.

Ronnie Cordova is drinking margaritas poolside when a gang of Frogmen attack him. He defeats dozens of the frogmen intruders and comes face to face with the Frogmen's leader (Jon Heder) after he emerges from Cordova's pool and births a doppelgänger (Dan Heder, in a parody of The Manitou), The Manitou Frogmen knock Cordova into the pool and mock him by telling him they have killed his master, but Cordova replies that it was only his master's clone. The Frogmen nearly drown Cordova, but he is saved when Doug Jones (played by himself) impales both frogmen with wooden stakes.

Jones explains that he is Cordova's father, whereupon Burger appears and claims that this cannot be true “cause Ronnie Cordova’s father is black!” Cordova, confused, asks Burger to let him deal with it.

Burger heads to a laboratory to perform a DNA comparison, while Ronnie and Jones stay at the pool to catch up. Jones poisons Ronnie as Burger discovers that the DNA does not match. Cordova asks Jones why he would do this, and it is explained that Cordova's father killed Jones' son Guillermo. Jones throws Cordova into the pool and an animated sequence showing Ronnie's anthropomorphized lungs drowning is shown.

Burger arrives at the pool and defeats Jones, who asks his Guillermo for forgiveness as he dies. Burger performs CPR on Cordova, who hallucinates that he is in heaven, and sees his mother before being resuscitated. Ronnie awakes and asks Burger whether they are gay for having engaged in CPR. He then laughs pulls a chewing gum out of his mouth and puts it in Burger's.

As end card is displayed, followed by a scene wherein Cordova's father, Master Cordova (Isaac C. Singleton Jr.), is approached by an agent who tells him that they have found his son. The Master stokes his beard and says "Hello, Ronnie."

Sockbaby 4 premiered at San Diego Comic-Con on July 25, 2008.

== Cast ==
- John Soares as Ronnie Cordova
- Cody Spurlock as Burger
- Uriel Padilla as Davis the Grey
- Justin Spurlock as Chum-Chum
- Doug TenNapel as Lord Opticord
- Rob Schrab as Impaled Frogman
- Kate Freund as Mother Cordova
- Jon Heder as Manitou Frogman
- Dan Heder as Manitou Frogman
- Doug Jones as Himself
- Isaac C. Singleton Jr. as Master Cordova

== Production ==
In addition to the numerous choreographed fight sequences, Sockbaby features 2D animated sequences and 3D animated characters produced by Mike Dietz and Ed Schofield at Pencil Test Studios.

The score was composed by Justin Ridge and features Five Iron Frenzy trombonist Dennis Culp.

== Awards and nominations ==
| Year | Award | Category | Result |
|---|---|---|---|
| 2004 | Channy Award | Best Fight Choreography | Won |
