= The Ghosts of Watt O'Hugh =

The Ghosts of Watt O'Hugh is the first in a series of novels by Steven S. Drachman (2011). The books fall into the category of science fiction Western and tell the story of an American Civil War veteran who becomes a dime novel hero while engaging in various fantastic adventures. The books also feature true-life characters such as Oscar Wilde, J.P. Morgan, the first-century Chinese emperor Wang Mang and the mathematician Leopold Kronecker, who appears as a villain.

== Plot summary ==
From the Boston Phoenix:

The title hero – a Western legend, Civil War Veteran, and Wild West Show star – has, like Billy Pilgrim in Kurt Vonnegut's Slaughterhouse Five become unstuck in time. Also like Pilgrim, who was forever traumatized by the Allied bombing of Dresden during World War II, at the heart of Watt's chronological peregrinations is a tragic historical event, in his case the 1863 New York City Draft Riots during which uncounted African-Americans were lynched.

Love also plays a major part in Watt's tale: he's lost his heart to Lucy Billings, a beautiful firebrand and fighter for justice who unfortunately has taken up with someone whose revolutionary commitment is greater than his own. But there are other amorous solaces with which he passes the time, or times; like Emelina, a bawdy barmaid and apparently immortal revenant.

In this teeming tome, including cameos by Oscar Wilde and J.P. Morgan, the latter of whom is responsible for one of Watt's grimmer misadventures when he has the redoubtable cowpoke tossed into the Wyoming Territorial Prison in Laramie on a murder charge.

== Literary significance & criticism ==
Kirkus Reviews called The Ghosts of Watt O'Hugh "fast-paced, energetic and fun; a dime-novel for modern intellectuals," The Midwest Book Review called it, "a humorous and fun adventure, recommended", the Bethesda Gazette described it as "Quixote-esque," and The Boston Phoenix called it "a rip-snorting, mind-boggling novel," adding, "there's a lot going on in this teeming tome!"

The novel received positive reviews from independent critics covering the indie book industry. Indie Bookspot, for example, wrote: "Complicated it might be, and sometimes dizzying, but The Ghosts of Watt O’Hugh is never dull .… Drachman has created a sense of real drama on an epic scale …. an ambitious and well-realised tale of American life."

The Ghosts of Watt O'Hugh received a number of industry citations and awards. Most notably, for example, the book was included on the prestigious and closely watched "best of 2011" year-end list by Kirkus Reviews. In addition, Ghosts was named Best Fantasy novel by Indie Excellence Book Awards 2012, one of the most prominent book awards for the Indie industry, and it was also named a finalist in the Action Adventure category by the Next Generation Indie Book Awards 2012.

== The author ==
Steven S. Drachman is a writer whose work has been published in The Boston Phoenix, The Chicago Sun-Times, Entertainment Weekly, The New York Times, The Washington Post, and The Village Voice. As well as the Watt O'Hugh trilogy, Drachman has gained recognition for his work on the Middle East war with the IsraelPalestinePeace e-zine and Enough Already: A Framework for Permanent Peace. The latter formed the basis for a 2014 TED Talk. Two of his teachers were novelist Raymond Kennedy and professor Hans Bielenstein at Columbia University.

== Background ==
The Laramie Boomerang noted that the novel's gestation began as early as the 1990s, and in an interview with the Bethesda Gazette, Drachman acknowledged that his tales about Watt O’Hugh, "a crusty old Civil War veteran who believes that ghosts protect him," took 15 years to materialize.

“In 2010," he said, "I had a huge health scare .... It turned out that I was misdiagnosed, and in fact, I was reasonably healthy and didn't have an awful disease. But I thought, ‘I could get hit by a car any day,' and decided to finish it.”

The book has been described as mixing real history with magical events; as the Leadville Herald Democrat in Colorado noted, "Leadville was selected for the book when Drachman was 'looking for a place that magically sprang into being' as Leadville did during the silver rush."
