= The Neverhood =

1996 video game

- Developers: The Neverhood, Inc.; Riverhillsoft (PSX)
- Publishers: DreamWorks Interactive; Riverhillsoft (PSX)
- Designers: Doug TenNapel; Mark Lorenzen
- Artists: Mike Dietz; Ed Schofield; Mark Lorenzen; Stephen Crow
- Writers: Dale Lawrence; Mark Lorenzen; Doug TenNapel
- Composer: Terry Scott Taylor
- Engine: The Neverhood, Inc.
- Platforms: Windows; PlayStation
- Release: Microsoft Windows: NA: October 30, 1996; PlayStation: JP: April 23, 1998
- Genre: Point-and-click adventure
- Mode: Single-player

The Neverhood (released in Japan as Klaymen Klaymen: The Mystery of Neverhood) is a 1996 point-and-click adventure video game developed by The Neverhood, Inc. and published by DreamWorks Interactive for Microsoft Windows. The game follows the adventure of a claymation character named Klaymen as he discovers his origins and his purpose in a world made entirely out of clay.

When the game was originally released, it was unique in that all of its animation was done entirely in claymation, including all of the sets. The gameplay consists mostly of guiding the main character Klaymen around and solving puzzles to advance. Video sequences help advance the plot.

In addition to being unique, The Neverhood aimed at being quirky and humorous, as is evident from the characters, the music, and the plot sequence. The game has garnered a cult following. It received a sequel in 1998, Skullmonkeys, which was a platform game, abandoning the adventure format of the original. Armikrog was later released as a spiritual successor to the game, developed by many members of the same team.

== Gameplay ==
The Neverhood is a point-and-click adventure game which emphasizes the solving of puzzles through character action rather than inventory usage. Klaymen must use the available environment in order to advance in the game, with the standard inventory being quasi-absent. There are possible game-overs if the player is not careful enough, with one where the game cannot be restored from a previous save and must be restarted.

== Plot ==
The titular Neverhood is a surreal landscape dotted with buildings and other hints of life, all suspended above an endless void. However, the Neverhood itself is strangely deserted, with its only inhabitants being Klaymen (the main protagonist and player character), Willie Trombone (a dim individual who assists Klaymen in his travels), Klogg (the game's antagonist who resembles a warped version of Klaymen), and various fauna that inhabit the Neverhood (most infamously the "weasels", monstrous, crab-like creatures that pursue Klaymen and Willie at certain points in the game). Much of the game's background information is limited to the "Hall of Records", which is notorious for its length, taking several minutes to travel from one end of the hall to the other.

The game begins with Klaymen waking up in a room and exploring the Neverhood, collecting various discs appearing to contain a disjointed story narrated by Willie (which Klaymen can view through various terminals scattered throughout the land). As Klaymen travels the Neverhood, he occasionally crosses paths with Willie, who agrees to help him in his journey, while Klogg spies on them from afar. Eventually, Klaymen's quest directs him to Klogg's castle, and for this Klaymen enlists the help of Big Robot Bil, a towering automaton and a friend of Willie's. As Bil (with Klaymen and Willie on board) marches to Klogg's castle, Klogg unleashes his guardian, the Clockwork Beast, to intercept Bil. The two giants clash and Bil proves victorious, but as he forces open the castle door for Klaymen to enter, Klogg gravely injures Bil by firing a cannon at him. Klaymen manages to get in, but Bil loses his footing and falls into the void with Willie still inside.

Alone in Klogg's castle, Klaymen finds the last of Willie's discs, revealing the full context of his tale: the Neverhood itself is the creation of a god-like being named Hoborg, who created the Neverhood in the hopes of making himself happy. Realizing that he was still alone, Hoborg created himself a companion by planting a seed into the ground, which grew into Klogg. As Hoborg welcomed Klogg to the Neverhood, the latter tried to take Hoborg's crown, which Hoborg forbade Klogg from doing. Envious, Klogg managed to steal Hoborg's crown, rendering Hoborg inert in the process, and the crown's energies disfigured Klogg. With Hoborg lifeless, any further development of the Neverhood ground to a halt. Having witnessed this, Willie (himself and Bil being creations of Hoborg's brother Ottoborg) discovered that Hoborg was about to plant a seed to create another companion. Willie took the seed and planted it far away from Klogg, with Willie hoping that whoever grew from the seed would defeat Klogg: that seed in turn grew into Klaymen.

The story ends with Willie giving Klaymen the throne room key through the terminal screen, hoping that Klaymen knows what to do once he confronts Klogg. Afterwards, Klaymen manages to enter the throne room, with Klogg and a motionless Hoborg waiting for him. Klogg tries to dissuade Klaymen from reviving Hoborg by tempting him with Hoborg's crown.

From here, the player may choose to take up Klogg's offer or take the crown to revive Hoborg:

- If the player chooses to take the crown for himself, Klogg gloats at his apparent victory, only for the now-villainous Klaymen, crowned and disfigured (similarly to Klogg), to instantly overpower Klogg and declare himself the new ruler of the Neverhood.
- If the player chooses to revive Hoborg, Klaymen distracts Klogg and manages to put the crown atop Hoborg's head, reviving him. As Hoborg thanks Klaymen, Klogg attempts to ambush them both, only to set off his own cannon which blasts him out of the castle and into the void. Returning to the building where Klaymen first started, Hoborg continues populating the Neverhood and orders a celebration when he is finished. However, Klaymen remains sorrowful over the loss of Willie and Bil, and Hoborg decides to use his powers to save Willie and Bil (to Klaymen's delight), and the game ends with Hoborg telling Klaymen, "Man, things are good".

== Development ==
Doug TenNapel came up with the idea of a plasticine world in 1988, creating approximately 17 structures. Due to his dissatisfaction with the way David Perry ran Shiny Entertainment, TenNapel left the company in 1995. Two weeks later he announced at E3 that he started his own company, The Neverhood, Inc., which consisted of a number of people who worked on the Earthworm Jim game and its sequel. Steven Spielberg's DreamWorks Interactive, which had recently started, needed fresh and unusual projects and TenNapel approached Spielberg with the idea of a claymation game, with Spielberg accepting it for publication. The Neverhood, Inc. made a deal with DreamWorks Interactive and Microsoft, and the game went for development. According to the developers, creating the game's characters and scenery used up over three tons of clay. The Neverhood was shown at E3 1996 under the title The Neverhood: A Curious Wad of Klay Finds His Soul.

After a year of work, The Neverhood was finally released to the public in 1996. The game elements were shot entirely on beta versions of the Minolta RD-175, making The Neverhood the first stop-motion production to use consumer digital cameras for professional use.

The game was released in English for Microsoft Windows and in Japanese for PlayStation in 1998. A fan-made Russian dub was released in 1997 and Russian subtitles in 2022. A fan-made Czech subtitles was released in 2026.

== Soundtrack ==
The game's soundtrack was composed and performed by Daniel Amos frontman Terry Scott Taylor and went on to win GMR magazine's "Best Game Music of the Year" award. Tom Clancy's video game composer Bill Brown called The Neverhood soundtrack "The Best of any of them (video game soundtracks)."

== Ports and legacy ==
A PlayStation port of the game titled Klaymen Klaymen: The Mystery of the Neverhood was made and released to Japanese audiences only. The game had some minor changes to the PC version such as longer loading times between rooms and the removal of the Hall of Records area. The Japanese release of Skullmonkeys, in turn, was titled Klaymen Klaymen 2.

In June 2011, it was announced via Facebook and Twitter that some of the original developers of The Neverhood were negotiating for exclusive rights to release the game on modern platforms such as iPhone, iPod Touch, iPad, Android phones, Android tablets and Windows Phones.

As official support had ceased, e.g. updates for modern OS and hardware, a fan group created new compatibility fixes in the "Neverhood restoration project" in 2013.

On July 21, 2014, ScummVM version 1.7.0 was released by the ScummVM project which added support for The Neverhood, allowing it to run on many supported platforms including Linux, OS X, Windows and Android OS.

== Reception ==
=== Sales ===
According to Leslie Helm of the Los Angeles Times, The Neverhood "won rave reviews" but was commercially unsuccessful. In early 1997, that paper's Greg Miller reported that the game's "sales have been slow and [it] isn't even carried by all of the largest stores, including Target". This came at a time when big-box stores were increasingly important for securing sales, as many specialized video game retailers had closed due to competition with these outside companies. By August 1997, The Neverhood had sold 37,000 copies in the United States. Sales in the region had risen to 41,073 copies by April 1999, a figure that CNET Gamecenter's Marc Saltzman called "embarrassing".

The Neverhood's total sales ultimately surpassed 50,000 copies, and "hundreds of thousands" of OEM copies were purchased by Gateway and pre-installed on its line of computers, according to Mike Dietz. It also received a huge fan base in Russia and Iran as a result of the massive bootleg copying and distribution of pre-installed games on computers.

=== Critical reviews ===
Reception

Review scores
| Publication | Score |
|---|---|
| Computer Gaming World | 4/5 |
| Famitsu | 29/40 (PS) |
| GameSpot | 4.9/10 |
| Next Generation | 3/5 |
| PC Gamer (UK) | 29% |
| PC Gamer (US) | 40% |
| Computer Games Strategy Plus | 5/5 |
| Dengeki PlayStation | 65/100, 50/100 (PS) |
| Entertainment Weekly | A |
| PC Magazine | 4/5 |

Awards
| Publication | Award |
|---|---|
| Computer Games Strategy Plus | Adventure of the Year |
| CNET Gamecenter | Best Adventure Game |
| Computer Gaming World | Special Award for Artistic Achievement |
| Computer Game Developers Conference | Best Animation (finalist) |

A Next Generation critic was pleased with both the visual style (which he said is essentially unprecedented on PC) and the execution of the graphics, but found the game is held back by unexciting puzzles and a generally slow pace. GameSpot likewise stated that the game has endearing visuals but is held back by the puzzles. However, rather than being dull, they judged the puzzles to be unfairly difficult and frustrating, remarking that "Clues are so abstract they will lead you to despair." GamePro contradicted, "While some of the puzzles are perplexing, none of them have solutions so obscure that you'll burst a blood vessel trying to solve them." However, they agreed that the graphics and the personality of the characters are the highlights of the game. Weekly Famitsu gave the PlayStation version a score of 29 out of 40.

The Neverhood was named the best adventure game of 1996 by Computer Games Strategy Plus and CNET Gamecenter, and was nominated for the latter publication's overall "Game of the Year" prize, which ultimately went to Quake. Gamecenter's editors wrote that it "went beyond anything seen so far in this genre". The game also won the 1996 "Special Award for Artistic Achievement" from Computer Gaming World, whose staff called it "the coolest-looking game of the year." While The Neverhood was nominated for the Computer Game Developers Conference's "Best Animation" Spotlight Award, it lost in this category to Tomb Raider.

Animation Magazine's film festival "World Animation Celebration" awarded the game "Best Animation Produced for Game Platforms" in 1997.

In 2011, Adventure Gamers named The Neverhood the 35th-best adventure game ever released.

== Sequels ==
A sequel to The Neverhood was released in 1998 for the PlayStation, entitled Skullmonkeys. It was not a point-and-click adventure game like the first installment, but rather a platform game.

Following the sequel, another Japanese PlayStation game set in the Neverhood universe called Klaymen Gun-Hockey was made. A Japan-only sports action game, it was based on the characters of the Neverhood, but was not developed by the designers of the original games; it also did not feature the previous releases' distinctive Claymation design techniques. The game is a variation on air hockey, only played with guns instead of mallets. It was developed and published by Riverhillsoft, the publisher of Japanese releases of the Neverhood series.

Klaymen is featured as a secret fighter for the PlayStation game BoomBots, also developed by The Neverhood, Inc.

On March 12, 2013, TenNapel announced that he had partnered with former Neverhood and Earthworm Jim artists/animators Ed Schofield and Mike Dietz of Pencil Test Studios to develop a "clay and stop-motion animated point and click adventure game". While stating that the game would not be a sequel to The Neverhood, TenNapel reiterated that the game would consist of his unique art style and sense of humor, and have an original soundtrack by Terry Scott Taylor. The game was titled Armikrog, which was released on September 30, 2015.

== Return to the Neverhood ==
In 2012, the authors of the original Neverhood released a musical novel, Return to the Neverhood. The story and soundtrack were written by Terry Scott Taylor, and the illustrations were drawn by Doug TenNapel.

== Cancelled film ==
On June 25, 2007, Variety reported that one of Frederator Films' first projects would be a claymation feature film adaptation based on The Neverhood. Doug TenNapel, the creator of the video game, signed on to write and direct the film. However, the movie was cancelled due to a lack of funding.
