= Iron West =

2006 graphic novel by Doug TenNapel

- Cover to trade paperback edition of Iron West
- Date: July 2006
- Page count: 160 pages
- Publisher: Image Comics

Creative team
- Writers: Doug TenNapel
- Artists: Doug TenNapel
- Pencillers: Doug TenNapel
- Letterers: Sno Cone Studios
- ISBN: 1-58240-630-8

Iron West is a steampunk Western graphic novel by American comic book creator Doug TenNapel. It was published by Image Comics in 2006.

The story is set in the American Old West, but features modern-day objects such as robots.

== Plot ==
In California, 1898, two miners discover an orb that makes an image of one of the men. A robot rises up from the ground behind them, takes a pickaxe, and kills them both.

Bounty hunter Strauss and his men track outlaw Preston Struck to Twain Harte. Struck is shot while he escapes onto a departing train, though Strauss's men follow him onto it. He meets an elderly Native American shaman named Two Rivers, who seemingly vanishes as Strauss's men arrive to kill Struck. They are killed by robots dressed as cowboys that attack the train with firearms, who kill everyone else on the train, save for Struck, who jumps out the window. Struck is found by Sasquatch and taken to Two Rivers, who heals him.

Two Rivers explains that miners illegally dug for gold on his tribe's burial ground, unearthing an "ancient cursed sphere" he refers to as the "Demiurge", an alien that seeks to destroy all organic life. He urges Struck to return to Twain Harte and try to stop the Demiurge's robots from taking over, but Struck instead leaves for San Francisco. He is attacked by a robot and falls into a quarry where the robots are excavating more of themselves, and is then chased into a cave by the robot and blinds it. He encounters the Demiurge, who explains that it wants to turn California into a "synthetic paradise." The blind robot shoots at Struck's voice, damaging the Demiurge and temporarily shutting down the robots. He runs into Strauss while fleeing, who captures him and refuses to listen to his warnings.

Struck is jailed in Twain Harte, and the town's sheriff and Struck's distrustful love interest, Ms. Sharon, do not believe him either. The robots attack and the sheriff deputizes Struck, who takes Ms. Sharon and the sheriff's horse Copper to go find Two Rivers. Strauss tries to stop him, but is killed by a robot. Struck intends to flee the state with Ms. Sharon, but is attacked by a robotic copy of himself. While fighting it, a robot kills Copper and kidnaps Ms. Sharon. Struck narrowly defeats his robot by jamming its clothing into its exposed gears.

Struck finds Two Rivers, who introduces him to the robots' "natural enemy": a tribe of robotic Native Americans referred to as "engines." The robots get the sheriff to surrender by holding Ms. Sharon hostage, only for the disguised Struck and the engines to stop them. Two Rivers casts a spell that turns a lizard into the Loch Ness Monster, which fights off the robots. The Demiurge, encased in a train, activates and converts it into a suit of battle armor, killing the Monster. The sheriff is fatally shot and gives Struck his badge before dying, reuniting in Heaven with Copper.

Struck wounds the Demiurge by blowing up the dynamite that is the ammunition for its revolver and then climbs the town's bell-tower, and ends up swinging into its damaged arm with the town bell’s rope. He ties the rope to the Demiurge and allows it to pull itself out of the armor, thus causing the armor to fall and crush it, permanently deactivating the robots. Struck proposes to Ms. Sharon and Two Rivers and the engines go "back to their home," his tipi revealed to be a spaceship. Struck deputizes Sasquatch, and some years later, the two walk through a meadow with Ms. Sharon and her and Struck's two children.
