= Ghostopolis =

Graphic novel by Doug TenNapel

- Date: July 1, 2010
- Page count: 272 pages
- Publisher: GRAPHIX

Creative team
- Writers: Doug TenNapel
- Artists: Doug TenNapel
- Pencillers: Doug TenNapel
- Colourists: Ethan Nicolle

Ghostopolis is a graphic novel, written and penciled by Doug TenNapel, colored by Ethan Nicolle and published by GRAPHIX, a Scholastic Inc. imprint.

== Synopsis ==
The story revolves around two main characters: Garth Hale, a young teenage boy, and Frank Gallows, a middle-aged agent of the Supernatural Immigration Task Force, a government partition dedicated to locating ghosts amiss in the physical world and transporting them back to the afterlife (here known as the title Ghostopolis).

Garth is suffering from an unidentified "incurable disease". It is mentioned that the relationship between Garth's mother and deceased grandfather was strained, Garth's mother referring to him as a "drunk".

Frank uses devices known as "plasmacuffs" to apprehend wayward ghosts. On a routine call to remove a Nightmare (a skeletal horse of the afterlife), Frank accidentally ports Garth to Ghostopolis along with the spectre.

In Ghostopolis, Garth unintentionally tames and befriends the Nightmare, nicknaming him "Skinny" due to the horse's incorporeal appearance. Before long, the hostile nature of Ghostopolis is revealed by local fauna that attacks Garth and Skinny. Narrowly escaping an attack by several Velociraptor skeletons, Garth determines that his best course of action is to venture into the main city.

Meanwhile, Frank is fired from his position on the Task Force for his grievous mistake and instead enlists his ghost ex-fiancée, Claire Voyant, to assist him in traveling to Ghostopolis and retrieving Garth.

Dazed and confused by the netherworld around him, Garth eventually happens upon his own grandfather, Cecil. Cecil is younger than Garth in appearance. As explained by Cecil, "There's no physics-based time here in the afterlife ... we get put back to our internal age. It gives us a chance to take care of unfinished business." It is mentioned that an argument about earrings was the source of friction between Cecil and Garth's mother, though he now looks down on it as petty. As Garth's time in Ghostopolis extends, and the closer Cecil comes to reconciling for his transgressions against his daughter (Garth's mother), the "older" Cecil becomes.

Along the way, Cecil explains to Garth the origins of Ghostopolis itself.

It was all built by one man ... a mysterious Tuskegee airman named Joe. He made every mountain you see, laying one chunk of sand at a time. He stacked every brick in Ghostopolis so that ghosts would have a place to live. Some say that it took him six days to build everything. Others say that it took him a billion years ... It's hard to say how long it took since time is all jumbled up in Ghostopolis.

— Cecil Hale, Ghostopolis, pp. 83-85

Now, however, a malevolent character named Vaugner currently rules over Ghostopolis and its inhabitants. Cecil insists that Garth's best bet for getting back home is to find Joe. It becomes clear, however, that Vaugner and his henchmen wish to capture Garth due to his anomalous status in Ghostopolis. Garth has also displayed numerous supernatural powers when in the realm of the afterlife, piquing Vaugner's interest.

In the city center of Ghostopolis, Vaugner addresses the masses alongside the lords of Ghostopolis's various divisions. The Specter King from the South, The Will-o-the-Wisp Queen, the Mummy Pharaoh, the Duke of Goblin, the Bone King, the Zombie Lord, and the King of Boogeymen all hold territory and command citizens in Ghostopolis, although ultimately under Vaugner's reign. When Garth and Cecil arrive at the city center, Cecil recounts the tale of how Vaugner came to be ruler of Ghostopolis.

... The provinces were manipulated into war with one another by Vaugner. He played one side against the other, weakening each kingdom along the way ... Then Vaugner came and presented himself as a great peacemaker. He promised them unity. Under Vaugner's one state of Ghostopolis, of course. Everything was fine ... until he started conjuring up insects from the underworld to do his bidding. Now Ghostopolis is a dump full of crime and bugs. All good ghosts dream of escaping to Earth.

— Cecil Hale, Ghostopolis, pp. 118-121

In the city, Frank and Claire meet up with Garth and Cecil. When they are ambushed by Vaugner's henchmen, Cecil is accidentally sent back to the physical world mid-skirmish, simultaneously expending Frank and Claire's ride back home. The remaining trio is secured by the Bone King, who, as it turns out, is in league with Joe himself. Unbeknownst to Vaugner, Joe is trafficking people from the corrupt Ghostopolis to a more perfect afterlife through a crack in the very wall of Ghostopolis. Garth attempts to leave through the crack, but is told by Joe that it will take Garth "home, but not to Earth".

Having exhausted what they thought to be their last option, Garth, Frank and Claire are escorted by the Bone King to the Firefly power plant, Ghostopolis's main source of energy, in hopes of recharging the set of plasmacuffs that initially transported Garth and Skinny to Ghostopolis. Recharging them would provide enough power to reverse the effect and send the trio back to Earth.

Vaugner ambushes the group and the Firefly is destroyed, yet again extinguishing hopes of returning to Earth. Suddenly, a Supernatural Immigration Task Force extraction team from Earth appears and attempts to collect Garth. Vaugner returns, apparently unharmed, and sends the team's ship back to Earth without Frank, Garth, and Claire. Frank's boss is also left stranded in Ghostopolis.

It is revealed that Vaugner (now known as Dean Vaugner) survived the explosion because he is actually human, accidentally ported to Ghostopolis by Frank's boss, Lieutenant Brock, about 20 years ago, much in the same manner as was Garth by Frank. The situation becomes Vaugner's vengeance scheme, and he and Garth soon break into combat. In the midst of battle, Frank is killed assisting Garth in Vaugner's defeat.

After Vaugner's overthrow, Claire is unanimously elected Lord of the Afterlife. Frank appears, having died and passed to Ghostopolis, and rekindles his relationship with Claire.

In the midst of the celebration, Garth meets his anachronistically-aged son — this is attributed to the numerous time inconsistencies in the realm of Ghostopolis. This also implies (and is also explicitly stated by Garth's son) that Garth's "incurable disease" is, in fact, curable at some point in the near Earthly future. Garth's son informs him that all he must do to return to Earth is imagine that he can do so. Returning home with Frank's stranded boss in tote, Garth is reunited with his mother.

The graphic novel ends with Cecil, now an aged ghost in the physical realm, flying into the nighttime sky, having apparently made peace with his daughter.

== Publication history ==
The book was published in both paperback (ISBN 0545210283) and hardback format (ISBN 0545210275).

== Film adaptation ==
In 2009 a film adaptation was announced, with Hugh Jackman attached to star and produce under his own company Seed Productions, with both the Gotham Group and Disney.
