= John Soares =

American actor

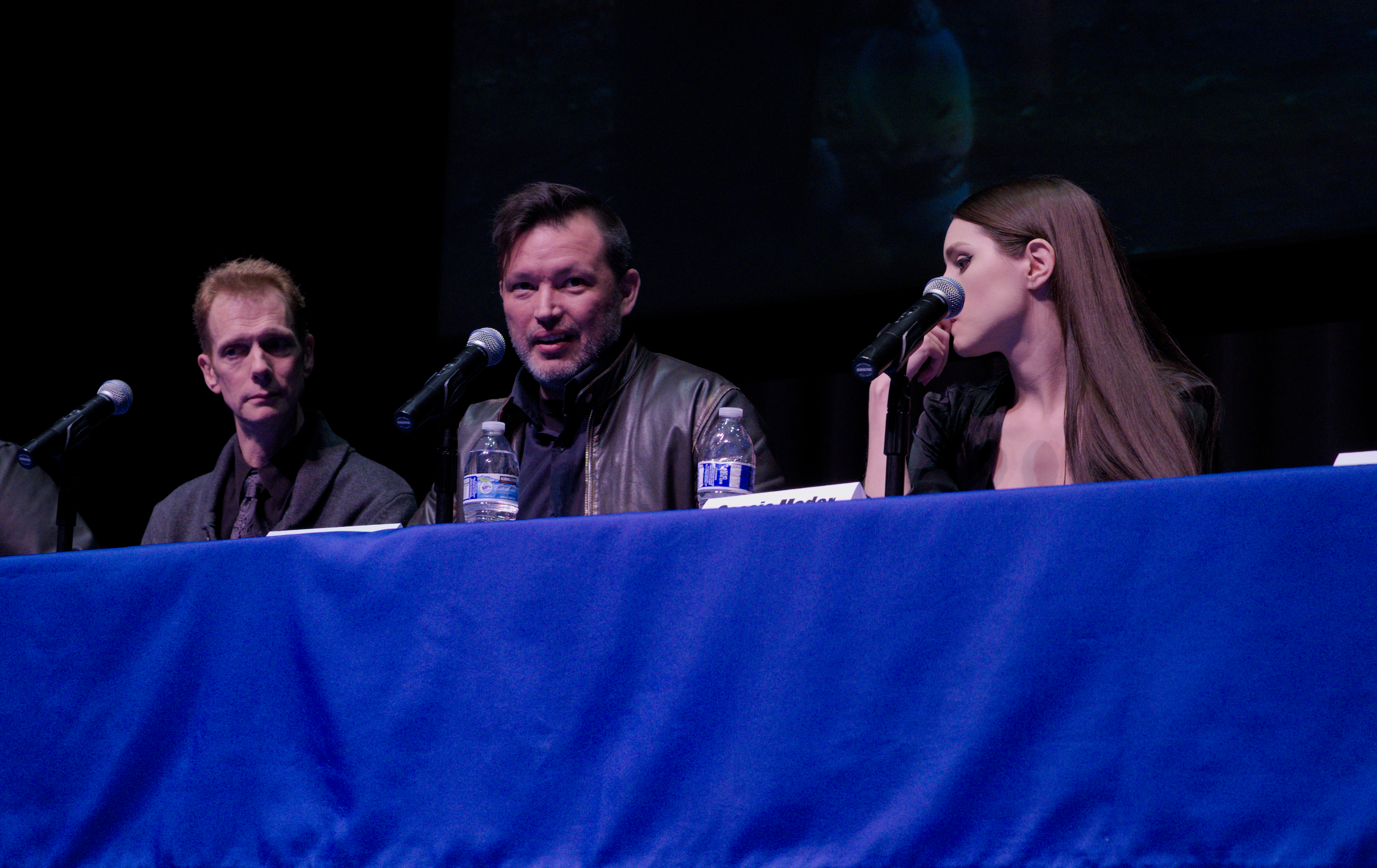
- Born: John Allen Soares; June 22, 1981 (age 44); Turlock, California, United States
- Occupation(s): Film Director, Actor, Motion Picture Editor, Fight Choreographer
- Years active: 2001 - Present
- Notable work: Sockbaby, The Danger Element, Looney Tunes Cartoons, My Adventures with Superman
- Website: www.johnallensoares.com

John Soares (born June 22, 1981) is an American film director, actor, motion picture editor, and fight choreographer. He is best known for his martial arts fight choreography in "Sockbaby" and "The Danger Element," as well as for his editorial work in animation on projects like Looney Tunes Cartoons and My Adventures with Superman.

== Early life ==
Soares was born in Turlock, California, and grew up in the Central Valley working on his family's almond farm in the agricultural community of Hughson, California.

In 1999, Soares enrolled in film classes at Modesto Junior College where he met his future filmmaking partners Ben Beames and Justin Spurlock.

== Career ==
In 2001, Soares founded Westhavenbrook Productions with partners Ben Beames and Justin Spurlock.

Soares co-directed Sockbaby (2004) with Doug TenNapel starring Soares, Cody Spurlock, Uriel Padilla, Justin Spurlock, Jon Heder, Doug Jones, Rob Schrab, Kate Freund, and Isaac C. Singleton Jr.

Soares worked as a motion picture editor for DreamWorks Animation from 2014 to 2017, on the animated series Little Big Awesome and the second season of Niko and the Sword of Light at Titmouse, Inc. Shortly after entering the Motion Picture Editors Guild, he was hired by Warner Brothers Animation to edit another Animated series, Dorothy and the Wizard of Oz. The show was canceled a couple of months later and John began editing Looney Tunes Cartoons for which he was nominated for a Daytime Emmy Award in 2021. Throughout 2021, John edited two Scooby-Doo animated features, one of which was Trick or Treat Scooby Doo. John has been editing My Adventures with Superman at Warner Brothers Animation since 2022.

Soares directed The Danger Element (2017) starring Soares, Doug Jones, Cassie Meder, Kevan Hewett, Joshua Krebs, Justin Spurlock, and Ben Page. He has been working on a sequel to The Danger Element entitled Jitni: Book of Lies for which a proof-of-concept short film was released to the public in 2022.

== Filmography ==
| Year | Title | Credited as | | |
| Year | Title | Director | Writer | Actor |
|---|---|---|---|---|
| 2017 | The Danger Element | Yes | Yes | Yes |
| 2007 | The Gauntlet of Sorrow | Yes | Yes | Yes |
| 2004 | Sockbaby | Yes | Yes | Yes |
| 2002 | Tao of the Meteor Serpent | Yes | Yes | Yes |

== Awards and nominations ==
| Year | Award | Category | Nominated work | Result |
|---|---|---|---|---|
| 2002 | Shocker Award | Best Fantasy Short Film | Tao of the Meteor Serpent | Won |
| 2004 | Channy Award | Best Fight Choreography | Sockbaby | Won |
| 2007 | ShockerFest Award | Guerrilla Software | Gauntlet of Sorrow | Won |
| 2007 | ShockerFest Award | Best Actor (Science Fiction/Fantasy) | Gauntlet of Sorrow | Won |
