= Skullmonkeys =

1998 video game

- Developers: The Neverhood, Inc.
- Publisher: Electronic Arts
- Designers: Joseph Sanabria; Vanessa Jones; Nicholas Jones
- Programmers: Brian Belfield; Kenton Leach; Tim Lorenzen
- Artists: Stephen Crow; Mark Lorenzen; Ellis Goodson
- Composer: Terry Scott Taylor
- Engine: The Neverhood, Inc.
- Platform: PlayStation
- Release: NA: February 6, 1998; EU: February 20, 1998
- Genre: Platform
- Mode: Single-player

Skullmonkeys is a 1998 platform video game developed by The Neverhood, Inc. and published by Electronic Arts for the PlayStation. It is the sequel to The Neverhood, and rather than being an adventure game, it is a platformer. Players again take control of Klaymen, who this time must defeat a horde of creatures called Skullmonkeys under the command of his old foe Klogg.

The game met with positive reviews, as critics liked the game's unique visual style (as with The Neverhood, the characters were all sculpted from clay) and music, but bemoaned the lack of variety in the gameplay. Terry Scott Taylor composed the soundtrack.

== Gameplay ==
In the single-player platform game, the player controls Klaymen, a resident of the Neverhood who is kidnapped in order to prevent the destruction of the Neverhood. He can jump, duck, look up, and grab a wide range of items such as a halo (allowing him to withstand more than one hit) and a wide range of quirky and crude projectile weapons. Aside from the assortment of weapons, enemies and bosses can be destroyed by jumping on them, and there are several secret levels (set to 1970s easy-listening music) where bonus points and extra lives can be earned. The levels are in a sidescrolling format, unlike the point and click format of The Neverhood.

Throughout each of the levels, clay balls can be collected to earn points, with extra lives being awarded upon collecting 100. Several bosses are stationed throughout the game to be defeated. The game uses a password feature.

== Plot ==
The evil Klogg was banished from the Neverhood at the end of the first game, but has now ended up on the Planet Idznak, which is inhabited by creatures known as Skullmonkeys and an insect race known as YNT. Klogg becomes the leader of the Skullmonkeys and sets off to make "evil engine number 9" to destroy the Neverhood, while Klaymen is brought onto the scene to stop him.

== Development ==
The game was announced in May 1997. Skullmonkeys was a strictly two-dimensional game developed at a time when this format was seen as increasingly outmoded. Project lead Doug TenNapel, however, preferred the 2D format and believed that 3D platform gaming could never work, being always plagued by depth-perception problems. Besides TenNapel, star creators who worked on the game included Mike Dietz (inventor of the animation process used in Disney's Aladdin and Earthworm Jim) and Mark Lorenzen.

Klaymen's motions were penciled first, then used in tandem with a model to record the animation. One method used by the designers to create the creatures in the game, was to take children's toys and cover them with clay to see what shapes were formed. A boss in the game, Joe-Head-Joe, is actually the face of Joseph Sanabria, one of the game's designers. The cutscene clips were created by applying stop motion animation to the modeled clay figures. TenNapel commented, "When I sculpt [clay], I feel very relaxed and comfortable, compared to doing art on the computer where you'll find me scowling and squinting a lot."

During development TenNapel said that composer Terry Scott Taylor "[is] coming up with this Hawaiian shit, like Don Ho. And we're like 'Go! Go!' because it's so stupid and so nongaming that we have to embrace it."

== Release ==
Electronic Arts published the game on February 6, 1998. The game was released in Japan by Riverhillsoft on August 13, 1998, under the title Klaymen Klaymen 2: Skullmonkey no Gyakushuu.

== Reception ==
Reception

Aggregate score
Aggregator	Score
GameRankings	80%

Review scores
Publication	Score
AllGame	2/5
Edge	7/10
Electronic Gaming Monthly	7.75/10
Famitsu	26/40
Game Informer	8.75/10
GameFan	92%
GameRevolution	A−
GameSpot	5/10
IGN	6/10 (1998); 8/10 (2008)
Next Generation	2/5
Official U.S. PlayStation Magazine	5/5

Skullmonkeys met with mostly positive reviews. The game's visual style, particularly the unique claymation format and imaginative backgrounds, were almost universally lauded by critics. Shawn Smith of Electronic Gaming Monthly (EGM) wrote that "The attention to detail and continuity of style in SM makes me wonder just how many hours the development team spent on the project". Most critics also praised the soundtrack, and multiple reviews made particular note of the bonus room song. However, most found that the monotony of the gameplay, with little variety in the enemies and a constant recycling of ideas in the level designs, far outweighed the pleasing presentation. GameSpot said that "what is most frustrating about Skullmonkeys is that it just wears you down after a while." Next Generation commented, "As a concept, Skullmonkeys works. But in practice, the idea has been squeezed into a monotonous series of simplistic levels that drone on and on with little variation between them. [...] If this started out as either a nostalgic tribute to great 2D platformers of old or as a parody of cliched gameplay conventions, it fails on both accounts, simply because the game hasn't been constructed solidly enough to keep the gamer's attention in order to prove either point."

Another issue was that many critics felt the side-scrolling platformer genre had been thoroughly played out by this point. GamePro remarked that the game's "platform-hopping action offers nothing new to this seriously worn-out genre." IGN concurred that "there just aren't that many new gameplay elements being introduced here. It's all standard jump-on-enemies' heads stuff, with little in-between." EGM represented one of the few positive responses to the game, with Shawn Smith, Sushi-X, and Kelly Rickards all commending it for its imagination, hardcore difficulty, and humor, though Kraig Kujawa fell more in line with the majority opinion, saying that the weak boss designs and lack of variety in the enemies make it not worth buying.

The game held an 80% on the review aggregation website GameRankings, based on six reviews. In a retrospective review, Allgame summarized Skullmonkeys as "far too dull and repetitive for most platforming fans."
