= Doug TenNapel =

American animator and video game designer

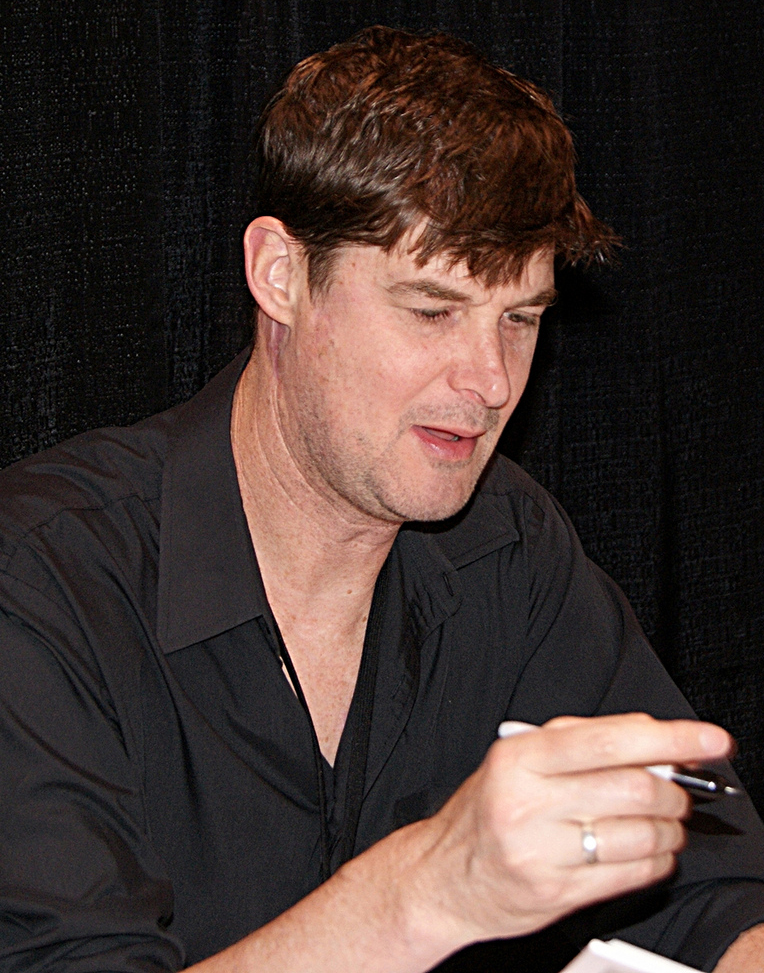
- TenNapel in June 2011
- Born: Douglas TenNapel; Norwalk, California, U.S.
- Occupations: Animator, writer, video game designer, comic book artist
- Notable work: Earthworm Jim; The Neverhood; Catscratch; Ghostopolis; Ratfist; Nnewts
- Political party: Republican
- Spouse: Angie TenNapel (m. 1990)
- Children: 4
- Awards: Eisner Award winner

Douglas TenNapel (/təˈneɪpəl/ tə-NAY-pəl) is an American animator, writer, cartoonist, video game designer, and comic book artist whose work has encompassed animated television, video games, and comic books. He is best known for creating the video game series Earthworm Jim, that also spawned an animated series, and the video game The Neverhood. He is also the creator of the animated television series Catscratch (2005–2007), which aired on Nickelodeon, and was itself a loose adaptation of TenNapel's comic book limited series Gear.

== Career ==
TenNapel began as an animator on Attack of the Killer Tomatoes. He soon began working in the video game industry on projects like 1993's Jurassic Park and The Ren & Stimpy Show: Stimpy's Invention for the Sega Genesis and The Jungle Book for the SNES and Sega Genesis.

In 1994, he created Earthworm Jim, the character that would star in Shiny Entertainment's video game, toy line, and cartoon series. Shiny Entertainment head David Perry later commented on working with TenNapel, "I wish I could find 100 Dougs, then I realized I was lucky to have been able to work with one. He is crazy talented, both crazy and talented! He also generates an enormous amount of amazing content and ideas, I wouldn't be surprised if he sleeps with a sketch-book!"

In 1995, he left Shiny Entertainment and founded his own company, Neverhood, with several other former Shiny employees. Working for DreamWorks Interactive, Neverhood created The Neverhood for the PC and PlayStation. The sequel, entitled Skullmonkeys, followed in 1998.

On television, TenNapel was the creator of the Project G.e.e.K.e.R. cartoon series for CBS. He was also a consulting producer on the ABC series Push, Nevada with Ben Affleck. Towards the end of the 2000s, he also created two shorts for Frederator Studios and Nicktoons, "Solomon Fix" (computer-generated 3D) and "Squirly Town" (traditional 2D).

As a graphic artist and cartoonist, TenNapel released his first comic book in 1998: Gear, a surreal epic based on his real-life cats, Simon, Waffle, Gordon and Mr. Black, in a war against dogs and insects using giant robots as weapons. The cats from Gear would eventually become the Nickelodeon series Catscratch.

TenNapel did the cover art for several of Five Iron Frenzy's albums, including a sculpture for their live album, Proof That the Youth Are Revolting. TenNapel has also created album covers and artwork for several Daniel Amos CDs, The 1999 tribute to the band, When Worlds Collide, the Neverhood soundtrack Imaginarium: Songs from the Neverhood and others.

Flink, a graphic novel by TenNapel, was released in late 2007 through Image Comics. Monster Zoo was released in early summer 2008. In May 2009 his graphic novel Power Up was released.

Between January and October 2009, TenNapel was a regular contributor to Breitbart News' "Big Hollywood" section, covering topics from movie reviews and the state of the comics entertainment industry to criticisms of the Obama administration and the environmental movement.

In July 2010, his graphic novel Ghostopolis was released. In 2009, it was announced the book would be adapted into a film starring and produced by Hugh Jackman for Walt Disney Pictures, but no update has been given since then.

TenNapel produced an episodic spoof of Japanese Super Sentai-style shows called Go Sukashi! based on a character by Shoko Nakagawa (who appears in the films), and starring John Soares and Brooke Brodack. He has also published an online superhero-genre-spoofing webcomic titled Ratfist.

In September 2012, Fox Animation optioned TenNapel's published Graphix novel Cardboard, with plans for actor Tobey Maguire's Material Pictures, graphic novelist Doug TenNapel, and the Gotham Group to be executive producers. Fox planned to have the picture developed under its WedgeWorks subsidiary. WedgeWorks director Chris Wedge (Ice Age) was producing, and considered directing the film as well. As of 2020, no update has been given on the film, especially given the acquisition of 21st Century Fox assets by The Walt Disney Company.

TenNapel has used Kickstarter to produce a bound collection of his sketches, named Sketchbook Archives.

TenNapel and other former members of the Earthworm Jim team at Pencil Test Studios launched a Kickstarter campaign in May 2013 to fund a PC game project called Armikrog, described a spiritual successor to The Neverhood and also being animated using clay animation techniques. It was successful, and reached its stretch goal for a Wii U version.

In 2018, TenNapel self-published the graphic novel Bigfoot Bill, launched as an Indiegogo, successfully funded and reaching various stretch goals.

In May 2019, TenNapel and other members of the original Earthworm Jim team announced a new Earthworm Jim game, to be released as an exclusive for the upcoming Intellivision Amico. He also self-published the graphic novel Earthworm Jim: Launch the Cow, again on Indiegogo.

== Personal life ==
TenNapel was born in Norwalk, California, a suburb of Los Angeles. He was raised in Denair, California, in the Central Valley. He has been married to Angie since 1990. The couple have four children. TenNapel was personal friends with Andrew Breitbart prior to the latter's death.

=== Political views and beliefs ===
TenNapel is a Christian. He is an outspoken Republican and supported Donald Trump's presidency. He regularly posts his political opinions on various social media platforms.

Since 2021, he has hosted Doug in Exile, a political talk show. It has been hosted on YouTube and Rumble.

=== Criticism and controversy ===
TenNapel has attracted criticism for his remarks on the LGBTQ community and its issues, including vocal opposition to same-sex marriage and intentionally misgendering a transgender journalist who criticized the Earthworm Jim video game.

He has dismissed this criticism, and has written that "transphobe (like homophobe) is a made-up word used to slander conservative people of faith with a mental condition, and is only used by SJWs". TenNapel was involved with Comicsgate, a right-wing campaign against diversity and progressivism in the superhero comics industry. Sean Gordon Murphy had drawn a cover for one of TenNapel's works, Bigfoot Bill 2, which he withdrew and issued an apology after being made aware of TenNapel's history of anti-LGBTQ comments. In response, TenNapel tweeted that it is "more important than ever that pro-family comic lovers support my work", stating his belief that LGBTQ people are waging a "culture war" against him.

== Bibliography ==
=== Graphic novels ===
Year	Title	Publisher
1991	They Called Him Evil	Mockingbird Studios
1998	Scud: Tales from the vending machine #3	Fireman Press
1998, 2018	Gear	Fireman Press/Image Comics
2002, 2019	Creature Tech	Top Shelf Productions/Image Comics
2004	Tommysaurus Rex	Image Comics
2005	Earthboy Jacobus	Image Comics
2006	Iron West	Image Comics
2007	Black Cherry	Image Comics
2007	Flink	Image Comics
2008	Monster Zoo	Image Comics
2009	Power Up	Image Comics
2010	Ghostopolis	GRAPHIX (an imprint of Scholastic)
2011	Bad Island	GRAPHIX
2012	Cardboard	GRAPHIX
2012	Return to the Neverhood (illustrations)	Stunt Grafx
2015	Nnewts – Escape from the Lizzarks	GRAPHIX
2016	Nnewts – The Rise of Herk	GRAPHIX
2017	Nnewts – The Battle for Amphibopolis	GRAPHIX
2019	Bigfoot Bill: Shadow of the Mothman	Self-published
2019	Earthworm Jim: Launch the Cow	Self-published
2020	Bigfoot Bill 2: Finger of Poseidon	Self-published
2021	Earthworm Jim 2: Fight the Fish	Self-published

=== Web comics ===
Year	Title
2011	Ratfist
2012	Nnewts

=== Children's books ===
Year	Title	Publisher	Notes
1997	Doug and Mike's Strange Kid Chronicles #1: Mighty Monday Madness	Scholastic Press	Co-written with Michael Koelsch
1997	Doug and Mike's Strange Kid Chronicles #2: Tuna Fish Tuesday	Scholastic Press	Co-written with Michael Koelsch
1998	Doug and Mike's Strange Kid Chronicles #3: Wisenheimer Wednesday	Scholastic Press	Co-written with Michael Koelsch
1998	Doug and Mike's Strange Kid Chronicles #4: Just Thursday	Scholastic Press	Co-written with Michael Koelsch
1998	Doug and Mike's Strange Kid Chronicles #5: Fateful Friday	Scholastic Press	Co-written with Michael Koelsch

== Filmography ==
=== Television ===
Year	Title	Note
1991	Attack of the Killer Tomatoes	Animator
1995–1996	Earthworm Jim	Creator, executive producer, and writer
1996	Project G.e.e.K.e.R.	Co-Creator and executive producer
2000	Koghead and Meatus	Short; Director and writer
2002	Push, Nevada	Consulting producer
2004	Sockbaby	Director, writer and voice of Sockbaby
2005–2007	Catscratch	Creator, executive producer, director, writer, and storyboard artist
2007–2008	Random! Cartoons	Creator, writer, character designer, storyboard artist, and voice director Episodes: "Squirly Town" and "Solomon Fix"
2009	Ape Escape	Writer and storyboard artist
2012	Adventure Time	Writer; Episode: "Sons of Mars"
2012	It's a SpongeBob Christmas!	TV special Stop Motion animator
2014–2016	VeggieTales in the House	Writer and executive producer
2017	VeggieTales in the City	Writer and executive producer
2017	The Legend of Boo-Kini Bottom	TV special Stop Motion animator

=== Video games ===
Year	Title	Note	Developer
1992	Sküljagger: Revolt of the Westicans	Animator	Realtime Associates
1993	Technoclash	Animator	Blue Sky Software
1993	Jurassic Park (Sega Genesis)	Animator	Blue Sky Software
1993	The Ren & Stimpy Show: Stimpy's Invention	Animator	Blue Sky Software
1994	The Jungle Book	Animator	Virgin Games USA/Eurocom
1994	Earthworm Jim	Creator, writer, designer, voice of Earthworm Jim	Shiny Entertainment
1995	Earthworm Jim 2	Creator, writer, designer, voice of Earthworm Jim	Shiny Entertainment
1996	The Neverhood	Creator, writer, designer, voice of Hoborg, Bil, and Klogg	The Neverhood, Inc.
1998	Skullmonkeys	Creator, writer, designer, voice of Klogg	The Neverhood, Inc.
1999	BoomBots	Creator, writer, designer	The Neverhood, Inc.
2015	Armikrog	Creator, writer, designer, artist, additional animation	Pencil Test Studios

== Discography ==
=== Cover art ===
Year	Artist	Album
1994	Daniel Amos	BibleLand
1997	Five Iron Frenzy	Our Newest Album Ever!
1998	Five Iron Frenzy	Quantity Is Job 1
1999	Five Iron Frenzy	Proof That the Youth Are Revolting
2000	Various Artists	When Worlds Collide: A Tribute to Daniel Amos
2003	Five Iron Frenzy	The End Is Near
2004	Terry S. Taylor	Imaginarium: Songs from the Neverhood
2013	Five Iron Frenzy	Engine of a Million Plots

== Sources ==
- Young, Sarrah (August 2005). "Father Figures: God Is in the Details of Earthboy Jacobus". Exclaim! (Canada). Archived from the original on June 3, 2007.
- Kit, Borys (March 12, 2008). "Paramount nabs 'Zoo'". The Hollywood Reporter.
- TenNapel, Doug (January 1, 2011). "Webcomic: Ratfist". Wordpress with Comicpress.
