= Gear (Image Comics) =

Six-issue comic series

Publication information
- Publisher: Fireman Press Ltd.
- Schedule: Monthly
- Format: Limited series
- Publication date: November 1998 – April 1999
- No. of issues: 6

Creative team
- Created by: Doug TenNapel
- Written by: Doug TenNapel
- Artist: Doug TenNapel
- Letterer: Doug TenNapel

Collected editions
- Gear: ISBN 1-58240-680-4

Gear is a six-issue comic book limited series written and illustrated by Doug TenNapel. It was published in six issues by Fireman Press Ltd, a production company and publishing house. The issues were reprinted in trade paperback form by Image Comics in 2007. Many of the characters presented in the book were retooled for TenNapel's Nickelodeon cartoon series Catscratch.

Gear featured black-and-white artwork mostly created with an ink brush by TenNapel. Many of its covers were photos of 3D sculptures, owing to TenNapel's affinity for stop motion animation. The Image Comics collection presents the artwork in full color.

== Plot ==
Gear tells the story of a podunk town of squat, hominid-like cats who are bordered on all sides by bigger and more war-like animals. The town's only protection comes from an aged Guardian, a gigantic battle robot in disrepair. The town elder sends four brave cats out to capture an enemy guardian to further defend the town. The cats are named Waffle, Mr. Black, Simon, and Gordon. They were named after TenNapel's actual pet cats. After tragedy strikes the cats in a battle with the neighboring dog faction's guardian, causing the death of Simon, Waffle begins blaming himself for the trouble and goes into the woods to end his own life. There he meets Chee, an insect from another warring faction. The two befriend each other, little knowing of the role they will both play in the oncoming battles.

The name "Gear" comes from a mystical artifact existing in the land which promises to greatly increase a Guardian's powers. Many parties search for the Gear, including a secret ninja-like Gear cult. The main plot revolves around the appearance of the gear and the subsequent mysteries it creates. Further themes in the story are the politics of the animal towns, the friendship of the four cats, the afterlife, and giant robot combat.

== Collected editions ==
The six issues of the comic were reprinted as a trade paperback by Fireman Press at the end of the comic's initial run in 1999.

The full color reprinting by Image Comics was printing in January 2007 (ISBN 1582406804)

== Television adaptation ==
Gear was loosely adapted into a Nickelodeon cartoon series titled Catscratch, though almost no elements from the comic book appear in the series. The series' protagonists are Mr. Blik (changed from Mr. Black in the books), Gordon, and Waffle while Simon is omitted from the series. Their designs remain mostly unchanged from the comics, and some facets of their original personalities remain. The story and tone of the show differ completely from the graphic novel, being more focused on slapstick comedy and aimed at younger audiences. Despite the differences between the two, the name 'Gear' is used for the cats' beloved monster truck, most likely in reference to the comics.
