= Catscratch =

American animated television series

- Genre: Comedy; Slapstick
- Created by: Doug TenNapel
- Inspired by: Gear by Doug TenNapel
- Directed by: Michael Girard
- Voices of: Wayne Knight; Rob Paulsen; Kevin McDonald; Maurice LaMarche; Liliana Mumy; John DiMaggio; Frank Welker
- Theme music composer: Terry Scott Taylor
- Composer: Terry Scott Taylor
- Country of origin: United States
- Original language: English
- No. of seasons: 1
- No. of episodes: 20 (40 segments)

Production
- Executive producer: Doug TenNapel
- Running time: 23 minutes
- Production company: Nickelodeon Animation Studios

Original release
- Network: Nickelodeon
- Release: July 9, 2005 – February 10, 2007

Catscratch is an American animated television series created by Doug TenNapel for Nickelodeon. It aired from July 9, 2005, to February 10, 2007. It is a loose adaptation of TenNapel's comic book series, Gear, which in the series is also the name of a monster truck owned by the three main characters. The series features music composed by longtime TenNapel collaborator Terry Scott Taylor.

== Synopsis ==
The series revolves around a trio of anthropomorphic feline brothers. After their wealthy owner Edna Cramdilly died, she left her riches to them, along with a menacing, oversized monster truck named Gear and a dignified butler named Hovis. The program commonly chronicles their wealthy lifestyles and action-packed, sometimes paranormal experiences. Other characters include the sweet young neighbor girl, Kimberly, with whom Gordon is obsessed, and the cats' competitive rivals the Chumpy Chump Brothers.

== Characters ==
=== Main ===
- Mr. Blik (voiced by Wayne Knight) is the oldest and the self-appointed leader of the group who is confident, pampered, surly, and vain. He thinks of himself as the smartest of the trio, but is ultimately very accident-prone, often getting himself into comically major trouble and being prone to near-death injuries. Mr. Blik is proud of his newly inherited riches and spends money on anything that spells respect and power. He always insults his two brothers, and his catchphrases are "Yeah!", "Suckers!", "I'm drivin'!", and "For I, and my ginormous brain...". He is a Bombay cat.
- Gordon Quid (voiced by Rob Paulsen) is the middle child of the three, and the most rational. He claims to be a member of the "Highland Quid Clan" and speaks with a Scottish accent, despite not being from Scotland. He is infatuated with "Human" Kimberly and loves to sing, regularly angering Mr. Blik. He enjoys cooking Scottish recipes, which many people find disgusting. He is a Manx and Munchkin mix cat based on his small tail, and has an orange patch on his right eye. His catchphrases are "Great Gopher!", "Aye!", "In the name of the Highland Quid Clan!", "Cheer!" and "Foul creature...".
- Waffle (voiced by Kevin McDonald) is the youngest and tallest of the three. A dimwitted and happy-go-lucky cat with an affinity for his many pet newts, his catchphrases are "Spleee!", "Woohoo!", "And Waffle!" or "Liar!". He is easily fascinated by many simplistic, everyday items and likes making flatulent sounds with his underarms. He is a grey American Curl with long, floppy ears and a long tail with dark periwinkle stripes like his right ear.

=== Supporting ===
- Hovis (voiced by Maurice LaMarche) is Mrs. Cramdilly's butler who looks after the cats and collects his measly paychecks (which Mr. Blik signs). Hovis is not exactly thrilled about his new situation, but hails from a long line of butlers who have served in the house and honestly believes that he has nowhere else to go. Therefore, Hovis puts up with the fact that the former pets have become his masters. Mr. Blik barks out orders to him constantly, Gordon treats him as an equal, and Waffle has not quite figured out that he is not a pet anymore (though he still asks Hovis to be let out and scratched behind his ears). His birthday is April 14, as seen in the episode "Love Jackal".
- Human Kimberly (voiced by Liliana Mumy) is an 8-year-old girl who has a good-natured personality, a gap in her teeth, and an obsession with unicorns. Kimberly is one of the few human friends the cats have. Kimberly does not think they are greedy and just accepts her feline neighbors for who they are and sees the good in their hearts. Kimberly is also completely unaware of Gordon's infatuation with her. Kimberly has three human friends named Kaitlin, Kaitlyn, and Charlotte. Although she is not in many episodes, her most notable appearances are in the episodes "Unicorn Club", "Love Cats", and "Core-uption".
- Randall (voiced by Frank Welker) is an antagonistic male brown grizzly bear who is on the hunt for the three cat brothers. Randall knows where the cats live and will sometimes be at their door to eat them up as soon as it is opened.
- Katilda (voiced by Hynden Walch) is a female, yellow cat who arrives on the scene at the tail end of the series. She has an overactive imagination and is slightly crazy. Mr. Blik appears to have a crush on her, which she briefly humors throughout her appearances. She only appears in "Katilda" and "Blikmail".

== Production ==
After Nickelodeon greenlit the series, Catscratch went into production in June 2004. The series was first announced at Nickelodeon's March 2005 upfront, confirming a 13-episode order. It was slated for release in September 2005, but was pushed forward to July. Later in the year, Nickelodeon ordered 7 more episodes, bringing the episode count to 20. End credits note that the final episode was produced in 2006. Catscratch was eventually cancelled in 2007 without public explanation.

== Episodes ==
=== Series overview ===
Season	Episodes	Originally released	
Season	Episodes	First released	Last released
1	20	July 9, 2005	February 10, 2007

No.	Title	Written by	Storyboard by	Original release date
1a	"To the Moon"	Peter Hastings	Luther McLaurin	July 9, 2005
Mr. Blik tries to win a barbecue contest by flying to the Moon to hunt for moon rocks after Gordon tells him a story about Duke Eark Splee.
1b	"Bringin' Down the Mouse"	Peter Hastings	Luther McLaurin and Guy Vasilovich	July 9, 2005
Mr. Blik will not let Waffle join him and Gordon on the Mouse Hunters' Ball because he never caught a mouse. Meanwhile, an evil blue mouse named Squeakus tricks Waffle by thinking that his brothers are actually mice. Guest Star: Phil LaMarr as Squeakus
2a	"Unicorn Club"	Peter Hastings	John Nevarez and Andy Schuhler	July 9, 2005
Gordon lies to Human Kimberly that he possesses a unicorn, which is actually his brothers in a suit, and they try to keep Kimberly from discovering the truth.
2b	"Go Gomez! Go!"	Peter Hastings	Lane Lueras and Luther McLaurin	July 9, 2005
The cats and the Chumpy Chump Brothers engage in a car race and bet the deeds to their respective homes. The problem is Waffle is the only one who's tall enough to drive.
3a	"Lovesick"	Peter Hastings; Story by : Josh Hamilton and Peter Hastings	Michael Girard, Lane Lueras and Luther McLaurin	July 15, 2005
Gordon has an allergic reaction, to a piece of broccoli that Human Kimberly gives him. Mr. Blik and Waffle recognize him as a monster.
3b	"King of All Root Beer"	Peter Hastings	Lane Lueras, Michael Girard and Doug TenNapel	July 15, 2005
Mr. Blik cheats to become the king of root beer, during a game show, making Waffle angry due to Waffle being the actual winner. Guest Star: Tress MacNeille as Sassyfrass
4a	"Tale of the Tail"	Mitch Watson	Lane Lueras and Tom Owens	July 22, 2005
Gordon Quid must defeat the kraken in order to wish for a long normal tail.
4b	"Mr. Pickles"	Mitch Watson	Lane Lueras and Luther McLaurin	July 22, 2005
After being dumped in Gordon's pickle juice, Mr. Blik turns green and no one listens to him anymore. When he subsequently leaves in guilt and becomes a hobo, his brothers realize they need him.
5a	"Off the Leash"	Mitch Watson	Lane Lueras, Luther McLaurin, and Tom Owens	July 29, 2005
Waffle is given a personality test by Gordon that indicates that Waffle might actually be a dog. But when his attempts to embrace his dog personality, he runs away from home of this. He becomes friends with the dog Barkmeat, but they get caught by a dogcatcher.
5b	"Slumber Party"	Doug TenNapel	Lane Lueras and Luther McLaurin	July 29, 2005
Human Kimberly buys all of the root beer in the store for a girls-only sleepover party. However, the cats have a plan to get root beer for themselves at any cost. The result is by disguising themselves as girls in order to attend the party.
6a	"The Ghost of Cramdilly"	Peter Hastings	Lane Lueras and Luther McLaurin	September 23, 2005
When Hovis becomes fed up with the cats' treatment of him, he disguises as Mrs. Cramdilly's ghost and says that the fortune will be given to Hovis, and the cats will be the servants. Before long, the cats try to defeat the "ghost" so that they can defend their fortune.
6b	"A Line in the Litterbox"	Mitch Watson	Sean Charmatz and Luther McLaurin	September 23, 2005
The cats divide the house in three parts. They later engage in a war using various items from their "kingdoms".
7a	"Love Cats"	Mitch Watson	Lane Lueras and Luther McLaurin	September 30, 2005
Mr. Blik falls in love with Kimberly when she insults him. He and Gordon fight for the love of Kimberly then. When Mr. Blik gets hurt, Gordon thinks Kimberly has chosen Blik, and subsequently becomes depressed and wants to escape to the stars.
7b	"Zombie Party a Go-Go!"	Mitch Watson	Lane Lueras and Luther McLaurin	September 30, 2005
When zombies arise from the graveyard thanks to a "dip" that Waffle made, Mr. Blik mistakes the undead for a group of fancy people he invited for dinner.
8a	"Gordon's Lucky Claw"	Mitch Watson	Garrett Ho and Jim Schumann	October 14, 2005
Gordon gets a lucky claw when he says that he's going on a trip to China. When determined to win the trip to China, Mr. Blik steals it. After having a fight with Waffle, Mr. Blik flushes the claw away when he says that the claw does not work for anyone. Then, however, bad luck happens to them.
8b	"Big-Eyed Bunny"	Mitch Watson	Michael Girard and Octavio Rodriguez	October 14, 2005
When Kimberly gets a new friend, Gordon becomes jealous and Mr. Blik accidentally torments Kimberly's pet rabbit, or at least thinks that he does.
9a	"Requiem for a Cat"	Scott Kreamer	Garrett Ho and Jim Schumann	November 18, 2005
The fact that nobody likes Mr. Blik comes to light when his health test at the vet indicates he only has 24 hours left. He promptly tries to make amends, but his efforts only lead Gordon and Waffle to believe he's trying to murder them.
9b	"Scaredy Cat"	Ken Segall; Story by : Mitch Watson	Lane Lueras and Luther McLaurin	October 28, 2005
Gordon refuses to celebrate Halloween, claiming it turns everything "evil". His paranoia comes to life when a pair of aliens mistake the cats' redecorated house for a mothership.
10a	"Hi Ho Kraken"	Mitch Watson	Lane Lueras and Luther McLaurin	February 3, 2006
The cats and the Kraken head to the Kraken Planet to regain Kraken's honor at any cost.
10b	"King of Clubs"	Peter Hastings	Heiko Drengenberg and Tron Mai	February 3, 2006
Mr. Blik tries to join a high society club but is dismayed when Gordon and Waffle are accepted instead.
11a	"Livesavers"	Scott Kreamer	Garrett Ho, Michael Mullen, and Jim Schumann	February 17, 2006
During a Polynesian vacation, Mr. Blik saves Gordon's life. As a result, Gordon is obligated to serve him, which gets on Blik's nerves very quickly.
11b	"Mecha-Kitties"	Peter Begler, Pennel Bird, and Mitch Watson	Lane Lueras and Luther McLaurin	February 17, 2006
While Hovis is away, Mr. Blik, Waffle, and Gordon make robots of themselves to do all the chores he usually does, but things go very wrong.
12a	"My Bodyguards"	Ving Pingerly	Wayne Carlisi, Sean Charmatz, Luther McLaurin, and Michael Mullen	March 3, 2006
In order to not get into a fight with a vicious alley cat, Mr. Blik gets the Chumpy Chumps' help. However, things do not end up as desired.
12b	"Charge!"	John McCann	Garrett Ho and Jim Schumann	March 3, 2006
When sliding down from the slide, Mr. Blik becomes charged with static electricity, though he does not know that the static electricity attracts to anything metal and so he gets stuck to it.
13a	"A Wooly Adventure"	Mitch Watson	Lane Lueras and Luther McLaurin	March 24, 2006
After a heatwave, an iceberg thaws, and a wooly mammoth springs forth and starts hanging out with Mr. Blik, thinking that he is actually his father.
13b	"EVIL!"	Scott Kreamer	Garrett Ho and Jim Schumann	March 24, 2006
Waffle becomes convinced that he is actually an evil genius and makes plans, to take over the world.
14a	"Clan Destiny"	Peter Hastings	Michael Mullen and John Nevarez	April 7, 2006
Mr. Blik and Waffle are dragged to Scotland in Gear by Gordon Quid to prove that he is from The Highland Quid Clan. However, they find no evidence that he was once one of them, so Gordon is left in sadness. However, Waffle and Mr. Blik learn a Banshee haunts the Highland Quid Clan. Unless Gordon can somehow get rid of the Banshee, this might be the end for him, the cats, and the Highland Quid Clan.
14b	"Mall-Adjusted"	Thomas Krajewski	Garrett Ho and Jim Schumann	April 7, 2006
Waffle bankrupts the cats, after purchasing his favorite new toy, which is all of the bubble wrap in the world. The cats are kicked out of the mansion while Hovis and the newts are repossessed and the newts were sold and the cats had to throw things away as they left the mansion. With no money, the cats are forced to work at the mall. Every time they go to work at many of the stores in the mall, they always get fired. When they finally find another job that involves making their own root beer, the brothers take their energy into making this. A string of gigs leads to a series of destruction, chaos, and, of course, firings.
15a	"Two of a Kind"	Scott Kreamer	Lane Lueras and Luther McLaurin	May 5, 2006
As their families prepare for battle, Waffle befriends the Chumpy Chump brother known as Lunk. The two have a blast together, but when their kin find out, Waffle and Lunk's friendship is banned. The two buddies decide they must run away, but when a disaster strikes their beloved brothers, these two like-minded pals must attempt to set things right.
15b	"Core-uption"	Jeff Lewis	Garrett Ho and Jim Schumann	May 5, 2006
Kimberly's teacher fails her on her project, which is a model of the Earth's core, made of glitter, cotton candy, rainbows, and other feminine stuff. Seeing Kimberly saddened, Gordon travels to the center of the Earth, and tosses her project into the core, which causes the Earth to transform. Clouds turn into cotton candy, unicorns roam freely, and it rains in glitter, among other unusual changes.
16a	"Katilda"	Mitch Watson	Heiko Drengenberg and Tron Mai	June 2, 2006
Katilda is the new cat in the neighborhood, and Blik finds her fascinating, although he does not want to admit it. With her charismatic leadership skills, Katilda soon has the cats following her into the woods to fight a terrifying monster. However, when it appears that Katilda's imagination may be a bit too active, it probably will not be easy for any of the cats to fight by her side. Guest Star: Hynden Walch as Katilda
16b	"The Secret Door"	Scott Kreamer	Kurt Anderson, Sean Charmatz, and Michael Mullen	June 2, 2006
Blik and Gordon do not know why Waffle keeps disappearing, until they find out that Waffle has discovered a secret world hidden inside the mansion, and in this world, he has become the king. Waffle finds out that being king has its price when the Dragon Rider forces Waffle into battle. Now, King Waffle must defeat the Dragon Rider and save his subjects. Near the end, however, they find out that the Dragon Rider is really Hovis.
17a	"Major Pepperidge"	Mitch Watson	Garrett Ho and Jim Schumann	September 22, 2006
While preparing for his own "Blik Parade", Blik suddenly grows a second head, and unlike Blik himself, the new head is much nicer. Blik loathes him, but everyone else loves the new head and his sage advice. If Blik does not want to be upstaged at his parade, he should to rid himself of the pest known as Major Pepperidge growing out of his neck.
17b	"Magic Staff"	Mitch Watson	Heiko Drengenberg and Tron Mai	September 22, 2006
After finding a staff that transforms the bearer into a hulking superhero, the cats get selfish. They each want the powers of a hero, even if they do not want to act like one. Later, when the guardian of the staff shows up to reclaim it, the cats must battle him to prove their worth, but they eventually realize that they may not deserve such power.
18a	"Free Hovis"	Reid Harrison	Heiko Drengenberg and Tron Mai	September 29, 2006
Through Waffle's own ignorance, Hovis is accidentally transformed into a giant, talking fish and washed out to sea. Soon enough, a traveling aquarium captures the poor butler and puts him on display. Blik, Waffle, and Gordon must track down the fishy side show and free their flippered butler.
18b	"Three Against Nature"	Thomas Krajewski	Lane Lueras and Luther McLaurin	September 29, 2006
Getting lost in the woods, an argument sends the cats down three different paths without one another. Luckily for Waffle, he becomes part of a fun hillbilly family. However, when they capture Blik and plan to cook him for dinner, the cats will have to put their differences aside and work together to escape.
19a	"Blikmail"	Nicole Dubuc	Garrett Ho and Jim Schumann	October 13, 2006
After Blik is blackmailed by Katilda, who threatens to tell Gordon and Waffle about his doll, he tries to get it back. His brothers think it is actually a Scottish mind-controlling figure.
19b	"Love Jackal"	Scott Kreamer	Lane Lueras and Luther McLaurin	October 13, 2006
The cats have forgotten about Hovis' birthday again, but they find out he was part of a band called Love Jackal. Soon, Hovis regroups the band together and he decides that he does not need the cats any longer.
20a	"Spindango Fundulation"	Scott Kreamer	Sean Charmatz, Heiko Drengenberg, and Luther McLaurin	February 10, 2007
When Mr. Blik beats the nearly-impossible videogame Spindango Fundulation, the cats are transported to an alien planet, where Mr. Blik must fight off evil invaders just like he did in the game. However, the game is rigged so he would win. Even though the stakes are high, Mr. Blik is determined to stop the aliens.
20b	"Duck and Cover"	Nicole Dubuc	Lane Lueras and Luther McLaurin	February 10, 2007
Gordon is afraid of a duck that he insists is evil, so Mr. Blik and Waffle set up a wrestling match to help him conquer his fear.

== Release ==
=== Broadcast ===
Catscratch aired on Nickelodeon and premiered in the United States on July 9, 2005. It temporarily ceased reruns shortly after the airing of episode 19 in October 2006 until the final episode entitled "Spindango Fundulation / Duck and Cover" aired on February 10, 2007, ending the series. As of 2026, Catscratch has not reran on Nickelodeon since 2007 and on Nicktoons since 2015. Additionally, the series is one of the few Nicktoons unavailable for streaming on Paramount+ or to digitally purchase.

== Home media ==
The series never saw any complete releases. There were only two Nick Picks volumes that each included an episode in 2006 and 2007. The episode "Livesavers" was to be featured on the Nick Picks Vol. 6 DVD, with a release date for August 7, 2007. However, the DVD was cancelled without public explanation.

DVD name	Release date	Ep#	Title
Nick Picks Vol. 3	February 7, 2006	1x01b	"Bringin' Down the Mouse"
Nick Picks Vol. 5	March 13, 2007	1x07a	"Love Cats"
Nick Picks Vol. 6	Cancelled	1x11a	"Livesavers"

== Reception ==
=== Critical ===
Sarah Wenk of Common Sense Media gave the series 3 out of 5 stars, saying that "Catscratch is a generic cartoon show that involves oddly drawn characters who don't really look like anything, very loud voices, very bright colors, and many instances of people and creatures and things being bashed, broken, and bonked. The show is a by-the-book program, but that doesn't mean it's not sometimes funny or even touching. Many kids will get a kick out of it, although you may not be as tolerant. There's nothing terribly wrong with it, but nothing terribly right, either."

== Awards and nominations ==
Year	Award	Category	Nominee	Result	Ref.
2006	33rd Annie Awards	Character Design in a Television Production	Luther Mclaurin for Catscratch	Nominated	
2006	Golden Reel Awards	Best Sound Editing in Television: Animated	"Love Cats/Zombie Party A Go-Go"	Nominated	
2008	Golden Reel Awards	Best Sound Editing in Television: Animated	"Spindango Fundulation/Duck and Cover"	Nominated	

== Comics ==
Confirmed by an e-mail from Doug TenNapel, there were a few 2-page Catscratch comics in the works for Nickelodeon Magazine. The first one came out in the December 2005/January 2006 issue. The second one came out in the March 2006 issue. The third and final one was in the February 2007 issue.

== See also ==
- Nicktoons
