= Armikrog =

2015 video game

- Developer: Pencil Test Studios
- Publisher: Versus Evil
- Producer: Ed Schofield
- Designers: Mike Dietz; Ed Schofield; Doug TenNapel
- Programmers: LoongWei Ding; Pip Robbins
- Artist: Ed Schofield
- Writer: Doug TenNapel
- Composer: Terry Scott Taylor
- Engine: Unity
- Platforms: Microsoft Windows, OS X, Linux, PlayStation 4, Wii U, Xbox One
- Release: Microsoft Windows, OS X, Linux: WW: September 30, 2015; PlayStation 4, Wii U, Xbox One: WW: August 23, 2016
- Genre: Point-and-click adventure
- Mode: Single-player

Armikrog (stylized as Armikrog.) is a stop-motion point-and-click adventure comedy game by Doug TenNapel in partnership with Pencil Test Studios and Versus Evil for Microsoft Windows, OS X, Linux, PlayStation 4, Wii U and Xbox One. It is a spiritual successor to The Neverhood, and is developed by many members of the same team. Like The Neverhood, Armikrog use clay animation.

== Gameplay ==
The game plays in a traditional point-and-click with a cursor to interact with objects and navigate around. The player controls two characters: space explorer Tommynaut and his sidekick Beak-Beak. Much like Klaymen in The Neverhood, Tommynaut has the ability to store items in his body. The player primarily controls him to do most of the grunt work like pulling levers, driving the Zipkicker and solving most of the puzzles. Beak-Beak has the ability to fly in certain areas and enter tight space that only he has access to. He can also digest small objects and pass them to Tommynaut by regurgitating them out.

== Story ==
On the planet of Ixen, the populace is in the midst of extinction without the power of P-tonium to sustain them. They send brother astronauts Vognaut, Numnaut and Tommynaut to a planet called Spiro 5 in hopes to find these crystals. Unfortunately, two of the brothers are dead due to unknown causes, leaving Tommynaut and his best friend Beak-Beak to continue onward.

After crash-landing on the planet, they end up locked inside a fortress called Armikrog. They find a baby girl named P and Tommynaut decides to care for her in hopes to find her parents. Upon further investigation, Tommynaut discovers that Armikrog was previously attacked by an unknown assailant who wished to possess the P-tonium crystals, which were assumed to be imbedded in Father and Mother, the guardians of Armikrog and also P's parents. The assailant killed both parents before learning that the crystals were transferred to P instead. Father and Mother's spirits live on in Armikrog as a result. Tommynaut later discovers that the assailant is Vognaut, who is somehow alive and has grown larger due to an unknown mutation. The evil brother kidnaps P and straps her into a device in hopes to extract the P-tonium for his own gain. Beak-Beak is later killed in an attempt to rescue the baby. Enraged, Tommynaut fights his brother and manages to escape with P.

After reuniting all 5 P-tonium crystals from P, the spirit of Mother thanks Tommynaut for saving her daughter. She then gives her blessings to use the crystals to power his home planet, which is more than enough to last for an eternity. Mother then transforms the Armikrog fortress into a giant robot that Tommynaut can use to navigate back to Ixen. Vognaut tries to kidnap P again before he is ejected out of the fortress and is crushed by its gigantic leg. The now transformed Armikrog ascends into space.

Tommynaut is then reunited with Beak-Beak, who is now a ghost. Suddenly, a distress signal is being heard from Numnaut, who too is alive. Tommynaut, along with Beak-Beak and P, set their next course to Darshon's Orb.

== Development ==
Mike Dietz and Ed Schofield, founders of Pencil Test Studios, teamed up with Doug TenNapel, with whom they worked on Earthworm Jim and The Neverhood, to use Kickstarter to crowdfund Armikrog. The Kickstarter's goal of $900,000, and stretch goal of $950,000 for a Wii U version were exceeded when the funding ended on June 27, 2013.

The game has a voice cast featuring Michael J. Nelson as Tommynaut, Rob Paulsen as Beak-Beak and the PresidANTs, Jon Heder as evil Vognaut, Veronica Belmont as Mother, Bob Baffy as Father, Charlotte Schofield as P, Yumi Iwama, Jeff Minnerly, Bob Doll as the Octovators, and Eddie Fantastic as Numnaut.

The game's soundtrack was composed by Terry Scott Taylor, who composed the music for The Neverhood soundtrack.

== Reception ==
Reception

Aggregate score
Aggregator	Score
Metacritic	(PC) 57/100 (PS4) 50/100 (WIIU) 56/100 (XONE) 61/100

Review scores
Publication	Score
Adventure Gamers	3.5/5
Destructoid	7/10
Game Informer	4/10
GameSpot	5/10
PC Gamer (US)	46/100

Armikrog received "mixed or average" reviews, according to review aggregator website Metacritic. Critics appreciated the fun art style and catchy music. As a fan of The Neverhood, Destructoid's Caitlin Cooke praised the game saying that it has a certain charm that only Doug TenNapel can deliver. She did however criticise the lack of an inventory system and outdated interface. GameSpot's Matt Espineli gave a 4/10 rating, with criticism stemming from underdeveloped characters, inconsistent sound design and confusing puzzle elements.

In 2017, TenNapel admitted that the developers ran out of resources to put the final polish in Armikrog.
