= BoomBots =

1999 video game

- Developers: The Neverhood, Inc.
- Publisher: SouthPeak Interactive
- Designer: Doug TenNapel
- Engine: The Neverhood, Inc.
- Platform: PlayStation
- Release: NA: December 1, 1999
- Genre: Fighting
- Modes: Single-player, multiplayer

BoomBots is a fighting game released in 1999 for PlayStation. It was created by Doug TenNapel, developed by The Neverhood, Inc., and published by SouthPeak Interactive. BoomBots features distinctive claymation visuals and various amounts of toilet humor. The game was both a critical and commercial failure. It was the third and final game made by the Neverhood, Inc. before the company folded in 1999 after the game's release.

== Gameplay ==
BoomBots is a 3D arena fighting game in which the player has the choice of ten characters (boombots) for either single player or multiplayer.

In single player, the objective is to beat recolors of the ten boombots (which includes a recolor of the player's boombot if they aren't a secret boombot) to progress through the story and win the game. If the player remains undefeated, they get to fight recolors of secret boombots in secret stages during the story, unlocking those boombots and stages upon victory. In total, the game features 15 boombots along with 15 stages.

Multiplayer is similar to single player, except that the player faces off in a round against a human opponent rather than an AI-opponent. In addition, the player can pick the stage to fight on.

== Plot ==
In the year 15 million (alternatively on Earth is 2033), a spaceship interrupts picnickers in an American park. The ship belongs to aliens, resembling cats, called the Feline Alien Research Troop (FART), led by alien cat Mandu. They begin abducting Earth's common household cats, using robots known as Boombots, and almost destroy Earth in the process. To stop the world from being destroyed completely, the scientists Dr. Doe, Dr. Pick, and Dr. Newton come up with the idea of just sending the cats to the aliens in a giant rocket. However, what humans do not know is that the cats have been protecting them from another race, the United Rat Infestation Nation. To bring the house cats back and to stop the rats from taking over, the humans team up with feline-alien double agent Paul to create the Boombots Underground Technology Team.

== Development ==
Development for the game started in January 1998, when Doug TenNapel designed ten of the robots for BoomBots. Eventually, in March 1998, TenNapel managed to show the designs to Steven Spielberg of DreamWorks Interactive. He then received his approval to have The Neverhood, Inc. develop the game alongside DreamWorks. During February 1999, SouthPeak Interactive showed interest in publishing BoomBots. When the game became a 'hit' during the May 1999 E3 trade show, SouthPeak announced that they would officially publish it. BoomBots then entered alpha development stage on July 15, 1999, reaching beta stage afterwards on August 15, before its US release in December that year.

== Reception ==
Reception

Aggregate score
Aggregator	Score
GameRankings	56%

Review scores
Publication	Score
CNET Gamecenter	7/10
EP Daily	4.5/10
Game Informer	4.5/10
GameFan	(J.W.) 88% 72% (Note: In GameFan's viewpoint of the game, three critics gave it each a score of 82, 73, and 60.)
GamePro	4/5
GameRevolution	C
GameSpot	1.9/10
IGN	3.5/10
Next Generation	1/5
Official U.S. PlayStation Magazine	2.5/5

The game received mixed reviews according to the review aggregation website GameRankings. Although the game received some praise for its clay animation cutscenes, it was noted to be otherwise lacking graphically. Primarily, criticism has been on the graininess and lack of detail of the characters and stages. In addition, although there was praise for the thematic diversity of characters and stages, the game was criticized in ultimately lacking replay value due to missing variety within character movesets. Furthermore, the criticism of replay value was also fueled by lack of gameplay elements within stages, and repetitiveness in character storylines. Jeff Lundigan of NextGen said of the game, "Imagine Power Stone ported to PlayStation, substitute 'wacky' robots, then add Claymation cut scenes that tell no story and are only vaguely related to what's going on. Finally, take everything that was good about Power Stone and put it somewhere else. That, in a nutshell, describes Boombots. Oh, and it's also frustrating as hell."
