= List of characters in the Terminator franchise =

The following is a list of characters, their plot lines and their performers in the Terminator film franchise consisting of six films. A list specific to the characters, their plot lines and their performers as presented in the television series Terminator: The Sarah Connor Chronicles can be found at List of Terminator: The Sarah Connor Chronicles characters; including supporting characters, and important villains.

== Overview ==
List indicators

This section includes characters who will appear or have appeared in the franchise.

- An empty grey cell indicates the character was not in the film, or that the character's official presence has not yet been confirmed.
- ^{A} indicates an appearance through archival footage or audio.
- ^{E} indicates an appearance not included in the theatrical cut.
- ^{O} indicates an older version of the character.
- ^{P} indicates an appearance in onscreen photographs.
- ^{S} indicates an appearance through use of special effects.
- ^{V} indicates a voice-only role.
- ^{Y} indicates a younger version of the character.
- ^{M} indicates a model with the actor or actress's likeness served as a body double.
- ^{L} indicates the actor or actress lent only their likeness for the film.

== Cast and crew ==
=== Original continuity (1984–2009) ===
Character	Original continuity			
Character	The Terminator	Terminator 2 Judgment Day	Terminator 3 Rise of the Machines	Terminator Salvation
Character	1984	1991	2003	2009
Machines
Terminator T-800 Model 101 (Note: In the first three films, the characters portrayed by Arnold Schwarzenegger are each credited as Terminator. In Terminator 2: Judgment Day, the character briefly uses the alias of Uncle Bob on the behest of John Connor. In Terminator 3: Rise of the Machines, the character refers to itself as a T-101 and is referred to in promotional materials as a T-850.)	Arnold Schwarzenegger	Arnold Schwarzenegger	Arnold Schwarzenegger	Arnold Schwarzenegger^{L}^{S} (Note: Arnold Schwarzenegger's facial likeness was utilized via CGI, applied to Kickinger's body performance. The CGI model was made from a mold of his face made in 1984, scanned to create the digital makeup.) Roland Kickinger^{Y}^{M}
T-1000		Robert Patrick		
T-X			Kristanna Loken	
Skynet Dr. Serena Kogan	Mentioned	Mentioned	Mentioned	Helena Bonham Carter
Marcus Wright Cyborg				Sam Worthington
T-600	Mentioned			Brian Steele
Humans
Sarah Connor	Linda Hamilton	Linda Hamilton Leslie Hamilton^{M}	Mentioned	Linda Hamilton^{V}
Kyle Reese	Michael Biehn	Michael Biehn^{E} (Note: Michael Biehn reprised his role as Kyle Reese in a cameo scene in which he visits Sarah in a dream of hers. His scene was cut from the theatrical release, but was later restored when the film was re-released in 1993 and 1997 under the name Terminator 2: Judgment Day – Special Edition.)		Anton Yelchin
Dr. Peter Silberman	Earl Boen	Earl Boen	Earl Boen	
Lieutenant Ed Traxler	Paul Winfield			
Vukovich	Lance Henriksen			
John Connor	Mentioned	Edward Furlong Michael Edwards^{O} Dalton Abbott^{Y}	Nick Stahl	Christian Bale
Miles Dyson		Joe Morton		
Danny Dyson		DeVaughn Nixon		
Tarissa Dyson		S. Epatha Merkerson		
Enrique Salceda		Castulo Guerra		
Kate Connor (née Brewster)			Claire Danes	Bryce Dallas Howard
Robert Brewster			David Andrews	
Scott Mason			Mark Famiglietti	
Blair Williams				Moon Bloodgood
Lieutenant Barnes				Common
General Ashdown				Michael Ironside
Dr. Serena Kogan				Helena Bonham Carter
Star				Jadagrace Berry

=== Battle Across Time continuity (1984–1991, 1996) ===
Character	Battle Across Time continuity		
Character	The Terminator	Terminator 2 Judgment Day	T2-3D: Battle Across Time
Character	1984	1991	1996
Machines
Terminator T-800 Model 101 (Note: In the first two films, the characters portrayed by Arnold Schwarzenegger are each credited as Terminator. In Terminator 2: Judgment Day, the character briefly uses the alias of Uncle Bob on the behest of John Connor.)	Arnold Schwarzenegger	Arnold Schwarzenegger	Arnold Schwarzenegger
T-1000		Robert Patrick	Robert Patrick
Skynet	Mentioned	Mentioned	No physical actor, network facility only
Humans
Sarah Connor	Linda Hamilton	Linda Hamilton Leslie Hamilton^{M}	Linda Hamilton
Kyle Reese	Michael Biehn	Michael Biehn^{E} (Note: Michael Biehn reprised his role as Kyle Reese in a cameo scene in which he visits Sarah in a dream of hers. His scene was cut from the theatrical release, but was later restored when the film was re-released in 1993 and 1997 under the name Terminator 2: Judgment Day – Special Edition.)	
Dr. Peter Silberman	Earl Boen	Earl Boen	
Lieutenant Ed Traxler	Paul Winfield		
Vukovich	Lance Henriksen		
John Connor	Mentioned	Edward Furlong Michael Edwards^{O} Dalton Abbott^{Y}	Edward Furlong
Miles Dyson		Joe Morton	Mentioned
Danny Dyson		DeVaughn Nixon	
Tarissa Dyson		S. Epatha Merkerson	
Enrique Salceda		Castulo Guerra	

=== Genisys continuity (2015) ===
Character	Genisys continuity
Character	Terminator Genisys
Character	2015
Machines
Terminator T-800 Model 101 (Note: In Terminator Genisys, the character is referred to as Pops and credited as Guardian.)	Arnold Schwarzenegger Brett Azar^{Y}^{M}
T-1000	Lee Byung-hun
Skynet Alex (Note: In Terminator Genisys, Skynet makes a physical appearance under the disguise of a resistance soldier who is credited as Alex (portrayed by Matt Smith). In the film, Skynet, now known as Genisys, makes additional appearances as a holographic human male ranging in age from 10 to 18 years old, and aged again into another form also portrayed by Smith.)	Matt Smith Ian Etheridge^{Y} Seth Meriwether^{Y} Nolan Gross^{Y}
T-3000	Jason Clarke
Humans
Sarah Connor	Emilia Clarke Willa Taylor^{Y}
Kyle Reese	Jai Courtney Bryant Prince^{Y}
John Connor	Jason Clarke
Miles Dyson	Courtney Vance
Danny Dyson	Dayo Okeniyi
Detective O'Brien	J. K. Simmons Wayne Bastrup^{Y}
Lieutenant Matias	Michael Gladis
Detective Cheung	Sandrine Holt

=== Dark Fate continuity (1984–1991, 2019) ===
Character	Dark Fate continuity		
Character	The Terminator	Terminator 2 Judgment Day	Terminator: Dark Fate
Character	1984	1991	2019
Machines
Terminator T-800 Model 101 (Note: In the first three films, the characters portrayed by Arnold Schwarzenegger are each credited as Terminator. In Terminator 2: Judgment Day, the character briefly uses the alias of Uncle Bob on the behest of John Connor. In Terminator: Dark Fate, the character goes by the name Carl.)	Arnold Schwarzenegger	Arnold Schwarzenegger	Arnold Schwarzenegger Brett Azar^{Y}^{M}
T-1000		Robert Patrick	
Skynet	Mentioned	Mentioned	Mentioned
Legion	Mentioned	Mentioned	Mentioned
Grace Harper Augment			Mackenzie Davis Stephanie Gil^{Y}
Rev-9			Gabriel Luna
Humans
Sarah Connor	Linda Hamilton	Linda Hamilton Leslie Hamilton^{M}	Linda Hamilton Maddy Curley^{Y}^{M}
Kyle Reese	Michael Biehn	Michael Biehn^{E} (Note: Michael Biehn reprised his role as Kyle Reese in a cameo scene in which he visits Sarah in a dream of hers. His scene was cut from the theatrical release, but was later restored when the film was re-released in 1993 and 1997 under the name Terminator 2: Judgment Day – Special Edition.)	Mentioned
Dr. Peter Silberman	Earl Boen	Earl Boen	Earl Boen^{A}
Lieutenant Ed Traxler	Paul Winfield		
Vukovich	Lance Henriksen		
John Connor	Mentioned	Edward Furlong Michael Edwards^{O} Dalton Abbott^{Y}	Edward Furlong^{L}^{S} Jude Collie^{Y}^{M} Aaron Kunitz^{V}
Miles Dyson		Joe Morton	
Danny Dyson		DeVaughn Nixon	
Tarissa Dyson		S. Epatha Merkerson	
Enrique Salceda		Castulo Guerra	
Daniella "Dani" Ramos			Natalia Reyes
Diego Ramos			Diego Boneta
Felipe Gandal			Tristán Ulloa
Major Dean			Fraser James

=== TSCC continuity (1984–1991, 2008–2009) ===
Character	TSCC continuity			
Character	The Terminator	Terminator 2 Judgment Day	Terminator The Sarah Connor Chronicles	
Character	1984	1991	2008–2009	
Machines
Terminator T-800 Model 101 (Note: In the first three films, the characters portrayed by Arnold Schwarzenegger are each credited as Terminator. In Terminator 2: Judgment Day, the character briefly uses the alias of Uncle Bob on the behest of John Connor.)	Arnold Schwarzenegger	Arnold Schwarzenegger	Mentioned	Mentioned
T-1000		Robert Patrick		Mentioned
Skynet	Mentioned	Mentioned	No physical actor, network facility only	No physical actor, network facility only
T-600	Mentioned		Chris Gann	Chris Gann
Cameron			Summer Glau	Summer Glau
Cromartie / John Henry T-888			Owain Yeoman Garret Dillahunt	Garret Dillahunt
Catherine Weaver T-1001				Shirley Manson
Humans
Sarah Connor	Linda Hamilton	Linda Hamilton Leslie Hamilton^{M}	Lena Headey	Lena Headey
Kyle Reese	Michael Biehn	Michael Biehn^{E} (Note: Michael Biehn reprised his role as Kyle Reese in a cameo scene in which he visits Sarah in a dream of hers. His scene was cut from the theatrical release, but was later restored when the film was re-released in 1993 and 1997 under the name Terminator 2: Judgment Day – Special Edition.)	Jonathan Jackson Skyler Gisondo^{Y}	Jonathan Jackson
Dr. Peter Silberman	Earl Boen	Earl Boen	Bruce Davison	Mentioned
Lieutenant Ed Traxler	Paul Winfield			
Vukovich	Lance Henriksen			
John Connor	Mentioned	Edward Furlong Michael Edwards^{O} Dalton Abbott^{Y}	Thomas Dekker John DeVito^{Y}	Thomas Dekker John DeVito^{Y}
Miles Dyson		Joe Morton	Phil Morris	Mentioned
Danny Dyson		DeVaughn Nixon	Shawn Prince	Mentioned
Tarissa Dyson		S. Epatha Merkerson	Charlayne Woodard	
Enrique Salceda		Castulo Guerra	Tony Amendola	
Derek Reese			Brian Austin Green	Brian Austin Green
James Ellison			Richard T. Jones	Richard T. Jones
Charley Dixon			Dean Winters	Dean Winters
Allison Young				Summer Glau
Jesse Flores				Stephanie Jacobsen
Riley Dawson				Leven Rambin

== Family tree ==
Reese–Connor family tree

Dennis Reese	Mary Shea
Jesse Flores	Derek Reese	Kyle Reese (Note: In The Terminator (1984), John Connor's adoptive son Kyle Reese is revealed to also be his father, sent back in time to fall in love with John's mother, Sarah.)	Sarah Connor	Robert Brewster	Mrs. Brewster
Tim Reese	Unnamed Child	Tara Holden (Note: Established in Terminator: Infinity (2007–2008) and Terminator: Revolution (2009).)	John Connor; T-3000 (Note: In The Terminator: Endgame (1992), time travel leads to John being born as Jane Connor in an alternate timeline.)	Kate Connor
Kyle Reese	Kyla Connor (Note: Established in Terminator Dreams (2003) and Terminator Hunt (2004).)	Kyle Connor (Note: Established in Terminator Salvation: The Final Battle (2013–2014).)	Sarah Connor II

== B ==
=== Kate Brewster ===
Katherine "Kate" Connor (née Brewster) is a fictional character from the Terminator films. She is portrayed by Claire Danes in Terminator 3: Rise of the Machines, and Bryce Dallas Howard in Terminator Salvation. Danes had previously been asked about returning for another film, and responded, "I don't think so. I felt sort of kidnapped by the production." When Charlotte Gainsbourg was unable to take the role due to scheduling conflicts, she was replaced by Howard.

==== Terminator 3: Rise of the Machines ====
Kate is a veterinarian in the present day (Note: Terminator 3 came out in 2003) and is engaged to Scott Mason; however, she is hesitant of marrying him. In the film, it is stated that just prior to the events of Terminator 2, she had a teenage makeout session with John Connor that might have led to a relationship, had the events of T2 not occurred. Scott is killed by a Terminator known as the T-X, and Kate evades it with the help of John and a reprogrammed T-850.

Her father, USAF Lieutenant General Robert Brewster, is the program director for Cyber Research Systems (CRS) and is overseeing development of Skynet. Through of her relation to Robert, Kate had trained in combats, and has access to her father's military contacts that would be pivotal to the formation of the Resistance in the future. Kate, John, and the Terminator set off to CRS to stop her father from activating Skynet. They arrive too late, however, and he is killed by the T-X. Kate and John reach a hardened fallout shelter in the Sierra Nevada mountains and are able to survive Judgment Day. They use communications equipment within the facility to contact survivors and start a Resistance force.

The T-850 reveals that after it assassinated John Connor in the future, Kate Brewster captured and reprogrammed the machine. Having succeeded John as leader of the Resistance, she then sent it back in time to protect their past selves.

==== Terminator Salvation ====
In 2018, Skynet's war has ravaged the Earth. Kate is John Connor's wife and is pregnant with his child. She is also a physician within John's unit, and later leads a rescue squad for him and others.

=== Robert Brewster ===
Lieutenant General Robert Brewster— portrayed by David Andrews in Terminator 3: Rise of the Machines — is Kate's father and a primary target for the T-X. As the program director at Cyber Research Systems (CRS), he took over development after obtaining Cyberdyne Systems' remaining assets. He is supervising the development of digital defense systems for the United States military, including Skynet. Brewster is hesitant to activate Skynet, as it would have unprecedented control over the country's unmanned defenses, including nuclear missiles. When a computer virus spreads around the world, Brewster is pressured by the Joint Chiefs of Staff to activate Skynet so it can destroy the virus, unaware that Skynet itself is it. Upon activating Skynet, Brewster is mortally wounded by the T-X to prevent him from interfering with the A.I.'s takeover. After giving the location of the Crystal Peak bunker, he entrusts John to take care of Kate before dying of his wounds.

John Connor surmised that, had the events of Terminator 2 not occurred, he would have met General Brewster through Kate. Consequently, if Brewster had activated Skynet on August 4, 1997, John’s ties to Kate’s family would have placed him at the epicenter of the AI's birth—irrefutably proving his mother right and, after the August 29 attacks, cementing his destiny as Skynet's enemy.

== C ==
=== Cameron ===
Cameron, portrayed by Summer Glau, is a Cyborg of an unidentified series sent back through time to protect John and his mother. She is shown to be the most advanced machine in terms of mimicking human emotions is also capable of eating. Her role is similar to that of the Terminator's from Judgement Day and Rise of the Machines. She is exclusive to Terminator: The Sarah Connor Chronicles.

== D ==
=== Danny Dyson ===
Danny Dyson is the son of Miles and Tarissa Dyson, and appears as a child in Terminator 2: Judgment Day, played by DeVaughn Nixon, and an adult in Terminator Genisys, played by Dayo Okeniyi. In Terminator 2, after Sarah Connor attacks the Dysons in an attempt to kill Miles and stop him from creating Skynet, Danny shields his father and begs Sarah not to kill him. After Sarah relents out of guilt and the Terminator reveals the truth to Miles and Tarissa, John takes Danny to his room for his safety.

In Terminator Genisys, where the timeline has been altered by Skynet since the events of 1973, by the year 2017, Danny has become the president of Cyberdyne Systems and is heading the creation of Genisys, which is a disguised Skynet, with help from both John Connor, who has actually been turned by Skynet into the T-3000 and sent to the past to ensure Skynet's rise while the Dysons remain unaware of the coming threat.

== G ==
=== Ginger ===
Ginger (portrayed by Bess Motta) was Sarah Connor's roommate and best friend in 1984. She is an avid fan of music and could frequently be seen carrying a walkman. She, along with her boyfriend Matt were killed by the T-800 when it came to Sarah's apartment looking for her.

The character of Ginger was originally written as an Aerobics Instructor, which in turn, was an occupation of Motta's at the time. A Gym scene depicting Ginger as an instructor was present in the original script, but was never filmed.

== H ==
=== Grace Harper ===
Grace Harper, primarily portrayed by Mackenzie Davis with Stephanie Gil portraying the character as a child, is a technologically augmented soldier from the year 2042 and the adoptive daughter of Resistance commander Daniella Ramos.

In an alternate future where Skynet was erased from existence, a different rogue artificial intelligence called Legion initiates Judgment Day. After being critically wounded by a Legion Rev-7 unit during a security detail, Grace volunteers to undergo cybernetic augmentation. The procedure grants her enhanced speed, strength, and the ability to detect Legion machines in close proximity, though the modifications require regular chemical regulation to prevent her body from overheating.

Following the Resistance's victory in the future, Grace is sent back in time to present-day Mexico City to protect a younger Dani from Legion's advanced Rev-9 assassin. She subsequently joins forces with an aging Sarah Connor and a T-800 unit named "Carl" to destroy the Rev-9. Through them, Grace learns about the original Skynet timeline and John Connor, realizing how Sarah and Carl's past actions inadvertently altered history and led to her timeline's future machine war. Although initially hostile toward Carl due to her combat stress reaction with killer machines, Grace grants him the benefit of the doubt after learning he has no connection to Legion and is actively seeking to make amends with Sarah.

To protect her younger mother figure, Grace initially conceals Dani's true historical significance, allowing Sarah to mistakenly believe that Dani is destined to give birth to a future savior. Grace eventually corrects this misconception, famously telling Sarah that Dani is not the "mother of some man" destined to save the world, but is instead the supreme commander of the Resistance herself.

During the film's climactic battle at a hydroelectric power plant, Grace is mortally wounded after being stabbed by the Rev-9. Knowing she cannot survive her injuries, she insists that Dani extract her internal power source to use as an EMP against the Rev-9. While dying, Grace reveals to Dani that she already knew she would perish fighting the Rev-9, having previously learned her destiny from Dani's future self. In a deleted scene, it is revealed that the future Dani attempted to intercept the Rev-9 to alter Grace's tragic fate but failed, ultimately forcing her to reluctantly send Grace back in time to complete the loop following Grace's pleading.

== L ==
=== Legion ===
In the film Terminator: Dark Fate, a new artificial intelligence named Legion is built in the near future. Developed for cyberwarfare by an anonymous technology firm under contract to the United States Department of Defense, Legion replaces Skynet. This new AI arose after Sarah Connor’s group successfully destroyed Cyberdyne Systems, preventing the government's original weapon program from triggering a machine takeover.

However, Legion similarly goes rogue, seizing control of global networks. In a desperate attempt to neutralize the threat, governments worldwide launch a nuclear counterstrike—but the failure triggers a catastrophic global holocaust. Legion then constructs its own army of machines to hunt and kill human survivors. Dani Ramos—Sarah Connor’s protégée and the leader of this altered timeline's Human Resistance—labels these machines "Terminators" and "Hunter-Killers" based on her mentor's training. While Legion's early frontline Terminators, like the mindless Rev-7 combat machines, lack human traits entirely, its later, more advanced Rev-9 model utilizes highly sophisticated social simulation protocols to blend seamlessly into human communities.

By 2042, Dani’s forces successfully crush Legion and its machines. Facing imminent defeat, Legion turns to time travel as a desperate last resort—a move the future Dani fully anticipates. Just before its ultimate downfall, the AI manages to send its surviving Rev-9 back to the year 2020 to assassinate a younger Dani. This action inadvertently sets off the very chain of events that pushes the young Dani to cross paths with Sarah Connor, initiating her transformation into Legion's ultimate enemy.

== M ==
=== Scott Mason ===
Scott Mason, portrayed by Mark Famiglietti, was the fiancé of Kate Brewster. She was in a dedicated relationship with Scott and had been blowing off her father's attempts to visit her in favor of focusing on their eventual wedding. One night when Kate is notified of a disturbance at the clinic, she tells Scott to go back to sleep and that she'll be back before he wakes up. While she's out, the T-X breaks into their Apartment and kills Scott as he awakes. Assuming his identity, it tags along with two detectives who are in a search for Kate and kills them immediately upon hearing her location. The T-X locates Kate as Scott and disinigrates his form in front of her before attempting to kill her, much to her horror. After the Terminator informs her that her fiancé is dead, Kate mourns Scott, taking the blame for his death, but John attempts to console her by saying it was not her fault.

Scott's last name was originally intended to be Peterson, but after the 2002 murder of Laci Peterson and her unborn son Connor committed by Scott Peterson, the character's last name was changed to Mason and a line of dialogue was altered. Despite the final film referring to the character as "Scott Mason", the end credits still list Famgiletti's role as "Scott Peterson".

== O ==
=== O'Brien ===
Detective O'Brien, portrayed by J. K. Simmons in 2017 and Wayne Bastrup in 1984, in the film Terminator Genisys, is a San Francisco Police Department detective and former Marine who investigates time travelers. In 1984, while working as a rookie officer with the Los Angeles Police Department, O'Brien and his partner encounter and arrest Kyle Reese upon his arrival from the future. After his partner is killed by a T-1000, O'Brien survives the encounter, becoming the only law enforcement official to believe Reese and Sarah Connor's warnings about Terminators.

Thirty-three years later, in 2017, the older O'Brien recognizes Reese and Sarah on the news following their arrival via time travel. Although Reese remembers him, O'Brien's superiors dismiss his claims about the pair. After Sarah and Reese are arrested while fleeing from the T-3000-corrupted John Connor, John infiltrates the police station and shoots O'Brien in the shoulder. Despite his injury, O'Brien frees Sarah and Reese, returns their weapons, and helps them escape in a police helicopter so they can prevent the Genisys operating system from initiating Judgment Day.

== R ==
=== Dani Ramos ===
Daniella Ramos, commonly known as Dani and portrayed by Natalia Reyes, is the primary protagonist of Terminator: Dark Fate. She is an automobile assembly plant worker from Mexico City who is destined to become the future leader of the human resistance against the machines. In this timeline, Skynet was erased from existence, but John Connor was assassinated, and Judgment Day was instead initiated by a rogue artificial intelligence called Legion. In the present, Dani is targeted for termination by Legion's Rev-9 assassin, while her adoptive daughter from the future, Grace—a technologically augmented super-soldier—is sent back to protect her. After her father and brother are killed, Dani goes on the run with Grace and is rescued by Sarah Connor, who initially believes that Dani's unborn son is the destined leader of the resistance against Legion.

After being led to Carl, a T-800 unit that previously killed John Connor, Dani decides to take an active role in defending herself to avenge her family. Despite her small physique, she quickly masters heavy weapons under the training of Sarah, Grace, and Carl. Dani offers her friendship to Carl, trusting the machine after recognizing its capacity for remorse and its capacity for love toward its own adoptive family. In the film's climactic battle, Dani distracts the Rev-9 to allow her allies to force it into a spinning hydro-turbine. Following a mortal injury inflicted by the Rev-9, a dying Grace insists that Dani use her power core as an EMP against the machine. Carl ultimately saves Dani by sacrificing himself to detonate the EMP, destroying both himself and the Rev-9. Aware that the machine threat persists, Dani allows Sarah to train her for the battles ahead.

Following Judgment Day in the future timeline, Dani rescues a young Grace and trains her to become her second-in-command. Upon assuming leadership as the Resistance's supreme commander, Dani applies the designations "Terminators" and "Hunter-Killers"—vocabulary from her own past training—to Legion's forces, which is subsequently adopted by her army. In a deleted scene, it is revealed that Dani told Grace she had previously met her protégée's time-traveling future self, explaining that she took the young orphan in to repay a debt to the future Grace. Attempting to alter Grace's fate, Dani tries to intercept the Rev-9 in the future but fails, ultimately forcing her to reluctantly send Grace back in time to protect her younger self and tattoo Carl's coordinates onto Grace's body, despite knowing it will seal Grace's fatal destiny.

=== Diego Ramos ===
Diego Ramos, portrayed by Diego Boneta, is the older brother of Daniella Ramos and her co-worker at the assembly plant. In the film, Diego is replaced by a drone and fired from his job without notice. When Dani goes to rebuke their supervisor about this, they are attacked by the Rev-9, disguised as their father, Vicente. They are saved by Grace, who has been sent from the future to protect Dani, but in the ensuing car chase, Diego is impaled by a piece of rebar by the Rev-9. After begging Grace to keep Dani safe no matter what (similar to Traxler in the first film), he is killed when the Rev-9 crashes into the car, causing an explosion.

=== Vicente Ramos ===
Vicente Ramos, portrayed by Enrique Arce, is the father of Daniella and Diego Ramos. He is the Rev-9's first victim, who kills and impersonates him in his mission to find and kill Daniella at her workplace. The Rev-9 appears at their home asking if Daniella is in, claiming to be her friend, but Vicente points out that all of Daniella's friends call her "Dani". The knowledge of this nickname and the guise of Dani's father enables the Rev-9 to gain her trust and nearly kill her before Grace intervenes.

=== Rev-9 ===
The Rev-9, portrayed by Gabriel Luna in its human form, is the main antagonist of Terminator: Dark Fate. It is a Terminator model created by Legion, an AI network that succeeds Skynet, and was dispatched back in time from 2042 to 2020 to terminate Dani Ramos and prevent humanity from revolting. The Rev-9 has a traditional solid endoskeleton covered by a liquid metal exoskeleton, similar to the T-X, but is able to split these two components into two separate, fully autonomous units.

Director Tim Miller wanted the Rev-9 to be "lethal and capable, but not so lethal that our heroes don't stand a chance to fight against him." Eventually, the crew decided on a Terminator with the T-800's endoskeleton and the T-1000's mimetic polyalloy skin. The Rev-9 is shown to have a deeper personality than the T-800, with Miller stating that he "is not some cold machine that has a limited personality like Arnold was. He is a fully featured character. He's more human than human, and if it's easier to charm his way past an obstacle versus kill it, stab it or break it down, he'll do that."

== S ==
=== Enrique Salceda ===
Enrique Salceda, played by Castulo Guerra in Terminator 2, is a Guatamelan friend of Sarah Connor. After Sarah is rescued from Pescadero by the T-101 and John, she directs them to Salceda, who has kept a secret cache of heavy weaponry and supplies for her to fight against Skynet's Terminators. After they stock up on weapons to prepare themselves against the T-1000, Sarah advises Salceda to take his family and go into hiding after sunset, since the T-1000 or the authorities will likely come to his home for the Connors. Following a nightmare about Judgment Day, however, Sarah leaves without John and the T-101 in order to assassinate Miles Dyson before he can accidentally create Skynet.

=== Peter Silberman, M.D. ===
Dr. Peter Silberman was a psychiatrist who worked for the state of California and with the Los Angeles Police Department. Silberman thought nothing of the so-called delusions shared by Kyle Reese and Sarah Connor other than being able to make a career from them being under his care. After a close call to seeing the Terminator in 1984, Silberman witnessed two in action in 1995 during Sarah Connor's escape from the Pescadero State Hospital.

He was portrayed by Earl Boen in the first three Terminator films, the only actor to appear in the first three films, aside from Schwarzenegger.

The Terminator: Dr. Silberman was brought in to question Kyle Reese, the soldier sent from the future to protect Sarah Connor from the Terminator that tried to kill her. He downplayed Reese's story as delusional and constructed in such a way that it cannot be refuted, such as how there was no evidence of advanced technology because the time machine can only send things back that generate a bio-energy created by living tissue, and seemed far more interested in using Reese to build his own career than uncovering the truth despite Reese's claims about the other two Sarah Connors who had been killed earlier that same day. He left the police station before the Terminator's attack, briefly passing him in the corridor.

Terminator 2: Judgment Day: Silberman was the chief psychiatrist at Pescadero State Hospital where Sarah Connor was imprisoned as a mentally unsound inmate. Having somehow not heard about the first Terminator's attack on the police station, Silberman made little headway with Sarah, and was constantly a victim of her attacks when the opportunity presented itself, even stabbing him in the knee at one point. Sarah briefly used him as a hostage when she threatened to inject him with poison to try to get out of the asylum, by forcing his staff to release her. He was left stunned when he briefly witnessed the T-800 and T-1000 Terminators as Sarah attempted her escape, particularly after seeing the T-1000 morph through a barred door.

Terminator 3: Rise of the Machines: Silberman resigned from Pescadero and became a post-trauma counsellor. He made a brief appearance when he tried to comfort Kate Brewster, following her encounter with the T-800 which was protecting her and John from the T-X. He shared his experience of being taken hostage by Sarah with Kate and tried to assure her that she was imagining things after she saw the T-800 unaffected by a bullet, though he himself appeared to doubt his own claims, implying that he still remembered the T-1000. He fled after seeing the T-800 for himself and recognizing it as a Terminator. In the initial draft of the script, Silberman was meant to die during Skynet's attack on humanity, fulfilling Sarah's prediction that he will die after Judgment Day.

Archive audio of Boen as Silberman from Terminator 2 is heard in the opening scene of Terminator: Dark Fate.

=== Star ===
Star, played by Jadagrace in Terminator Salvation, is an 8-year-old mute companion of Kyle Reese following Judgment Day. Harboring an ability to sense when Terminators are approaching, she and Reese encounter human/machine hybrid Marcus Wright in Los Angeles and attempt to locate John Connor, but she and Reese are captured by Terminators and taken to the San Francisco base where Reese is to be killed to prevent him from travelling in time to 1984 to protect Sarah Connor and conceive John with her. She and Reese escape with help from John and Marcus, though John is mortally wounded by a T-800 which is killed by Marcus. At a field hospital, after Marcus offers to give up his heart to save John, Star holds Marcus's hand for the first and last time, indicating that she has come to trust him.

== T ==
=== Ed Traxler ===
Ed Traxler, portrayed by Paul Winfield, is a lieutenant officer at the Los Angeles Police Department in 1984. He, along with his partner Vukovich, are the primary investigators in the Phone Book Killer case, in which two women named Sarah Connor are murdered in their homes. They help out Sarah Connor when she reports that she is being stalked, and Traxler advises her to stay in a public place until they arrive to pick her up. The perpetrator, a T-800 Terminator, attacks Sarah but she is rescued by Kyle Reese. In the ensuing chase, the Terminator crashes while the police arrest Reese, believing him to be the killer. Traxler and Vukovich observe Reese talking with Dr. Silberman and explaining that the Terminator was sent from the future to kill Sarah before the birth of her son, John, but was not sure which woman was its target so it decided to go for all three Sarah Connors in Los Angeles. Though Traxler becomes concerned, he tries to pacify Sarah by claiming that the Terminator is most likely an ordinary man on anasthetic drugs and wearing body armor, and arranges for her mother to pick her up. When the Terminator attacks the police station, however, Traxler attempts to gun down the cyborg with an m16A1, but the Terminator is unfazed and returns fire, mortally wounding Traxler.

A deleted scene shows Traxler still alive after being shot but slowly dying. As Sarah and Reese are fleeing the station, Traxler begs Reese to keep Sarah alive no matter what and hands him his revolver, showing that he now believes his future stories. Sarah holds Traxler's hand for a second before they leave.

== V ==
=== Janelle Voight ===
Janelle Voight, portrayed by Jenette Goldstein, is John Connor's foster mother in Terminator 2. In the film, she appears to have a strained relationship with John, who refuses to acknowledge her as a mother figure. She and her husband Todd direct both the T-800 and the T-1000 on their searches for John, unaware of who they really are. Later, the T-1000 returns to their home and kills Janelle first in order to impersonate her and lure John back to the house, but the T-800 sees through its ruse and hangs the phone up. Though Janelle's death is not shown, a deleted scene shows the T-1000 walk past the bathroom where her legs are seen, implying that it killed her while she was in the shower. In Terminator: The Sarah Connor Chronicles, John admits his regret for the Voights' deaths and that they wanted to adopt him to raise him in a better home.

=== Todd Voight ===
Todd Voight, portrayed by Xander Berkeley, is John Connor's foster father in Terminator 2. Like his wife, he does not seem to get on well with John, who addresses him by his first name. Like Janelle, he is killed by the T-1000 when he accidentally exposes it by shouting at the family dog, Max, to stop barking, as Max had detected a Terminator on the premises. The T-1000 kills him by impaling him through the mouth.

=== Vukovich ===
Detective Vukovich, portrayed by Lance Henriksen, is Lieutenant Ed Traxler's main partner in The Terminator. Along with Traxler, he investigates the first T-800's murders of two Sarah Connors, and manages to reach the actual Sarah it is targeting along with Kyle Reese, who was sent back in time to protect her from the T-800. As Reese is being questioned by Dr. Silberman, Vukovich is obviously amused by Silberman's slightly taunting remarks, while Traxler appears concerned. When the T-800 eventually does attack the police station to find Sarah, the police fight back and attempt to gun the cyborg down. After seeing Traxler mortally wounded, Vukovich tries to kill the T-800, who is unfazed and merely returns fire, killing Vukovich.

Vukovich was originally planned to return in Terminator 3: Rise of the Machines, having survived but bound to a wheelchair and now investigating the Terminators' activities, but he was cut from the script. Henriksen was also briefly considered to play the Terminator in the first film before Arnold Schwarzenegger was cast.

== W ==
=== Blair Williams ===
Blair Williams, portrayed by Moon Bloodgood in Terminator Salvation, is a resistance fighter pilot serving in John Connor's Tech-Com unit. After Marcus Wright, Kyle Reese, Star and human refugees are attacked by Terminators in Los Angeles, Blair is one of the pilots sent by John to intercept the Terminators and save the humans, but she is shot down by a Hunter Killer. She is later found and rescued by Marcus and they make their way to find John on foot, forming a close bond in the process when they are forced to fight off a group of human bandits. When they reach John's base, however, Marcus steps on a magnetic landmine, severely injuring him and exposing his metal endoskeleton. John, believing Marcus was sent to kill him, orders him killed, but Blair defies John and frees Marcus, though she is shot in the leg in the process. John orders Blair freed and treated medically before he leaves to help Marcus free Reese and the hostages from the Skynet base in San Francisco. Following the battle, in which John is mortally wounded, Marcus offers to give his heart up to save his life. Blair, who by now has fallen in love with Marcus, begs him to reconsider, but Marcus, who had previously caused his brother's death by accident, sees it as his redemption. Blair kisses Marcus for the first and last time, and watches the operation that takes Marcus's life.

=== Marcus Wright ===
Marcus Wright, portrayed by Sam Worthington, is a major character in Terminator Salvation. As a death row inmate in 2003, he donates his body to Cyberdyne Systems for medical research, prior to be executed for accidentally causing his brother's death. Marcus is turned into a cyborg and awakens in 2018 in the ruins of Los Angeles, where he encounters Kyle Reese and his mute companion, Star. On their way to find John Connor, Reese and Star are captured by Skynet's machines. Marcus gives pursuit, in the process meeting up with Blair Williams, a downed pilot, with whom he bonds. At the resistance base, Marcus is caught in an explosion and his metal endoskeleton is revealed. John takes him prisoner, believing that Marcus was sent from the future to kill either him or Reese, but Marcus informs him that Reese is being held prisoner in Skynet's San Francisco base. Though John orders Marcus killed, Blair secretly frees him, and he and John make a plan to rescue Reese together. At the Skynet base, Marcus encounters Skynet itself on a screen and learns that he was actually resurrected as a cyborg to lure John to the base where he would be killed. Marcus rebels against Skynet and decides to aid John in rescuing Reese and the human prisoners and fighting a T-800. Though John's heart is badly wounded in the ensuing battle, Marcus destroys the T-800 by tearing its head off, and they flee the base before destroying it with explosives. At a field hospital, Marcus offers his heart for transplantation, saving John's life, and bids his friends goodbye, kissing Blair for the first and last time.

As Terminator Genisys serves as a reboot of the franchise, the events of Salvation are ignored and Kyle Reese is depicted as being rescued and taken in as a child directly by John Connor, and his interactions with Marcus and Star are absent.
