= Terminator (character concept) =

Fictional assassin cyborg

- Terminator characters
- A full-scale T-850 endoskeleton prop built by Stan Winston Studio for Terminator 3: Rise of the Machines (2003).
- First appearance: The Terminator (1984)
- Last appearance: Terminator: Resistance (2019)
- Created by: James Cameron
- Portrayed by: Various actors

In-universe information
- Race: Cyborg/android
- Occupation: Infiltration unit
- Affiliation: Skynet; The Turk (Terminator: The Sarah Connor Chronicles); Legion (Terminator: Dark Fate)

In the Terminator franchise, a Terminator is an autonomous cyborg, typically humanoid, conceived as a virtually indestructible soldier, infiltrator, and assassin. A variety of models appear throughout the franchise. Within the fictional storyline, Terminators are created in a post-apocalyptic future by a computer AI known as Skynet, (Note: In Terminator: Dark Fate (2019), Skynet is replaced by a new AI known as Legion, following the time-altering events depicted in Terminator 2: Judgment Day (1991).) after it has launched war on humans. The machines are created to aid Skynet in its quest, and most are designed as infiltrators with a human appearance. Several Terminators throughout the franchise are reprogrammed by the human resistance to instead serve as protectors.

James Cameron introduced the first Terminator character in the 1984 film The Terminator, featuring a single cyborg simply called the "Terminator" or "Cyberdyne Systems Model 101", portrayed by Arnold Schwarzenegger.

== Fictional background ==
A T-800 endoskeleton seen in Terminator 2: Judgment Day

Terminators are cyborgs designed as skilled killing machines. In most franchise media, the machines are created in a post-apocalyptic future by a computer AI, Skynet, after it has launched a nuclear war against humans. According to the first two films, Terminators were created after the war started. The films Terminator 3: Rise of the Machines and Terminator Salvation feature an altered timeline affected by the destruction of Cyberdyne Systems in Terminator 2: Judgment Day. In this new timeline, Terminators were created by Cyber Research Systems, starting with the T-1. Subsequent films also feature their own alternate timelines.

A Terminator is a cybernetic organism featuring a synthetic exterior of living human tissue over a metallic endoskeleton. The skin is prone to aging and injury related deterioration. Terminators are generally used as infiltration units, their appearance allowing them to blend in with humans. Dogs are used by the human resistance to detect Terminators in disguise. Although designed to hunt and kill people, several of the machines are captured and reprogrammed by the resistance to instead serve as protectors.

Common Terminator traits include super strength, shapeshifting, vocal impersonation, and red eyes. A Terminator's point of view is also rendered in this color.

== Models ==
=== Humanoid ===
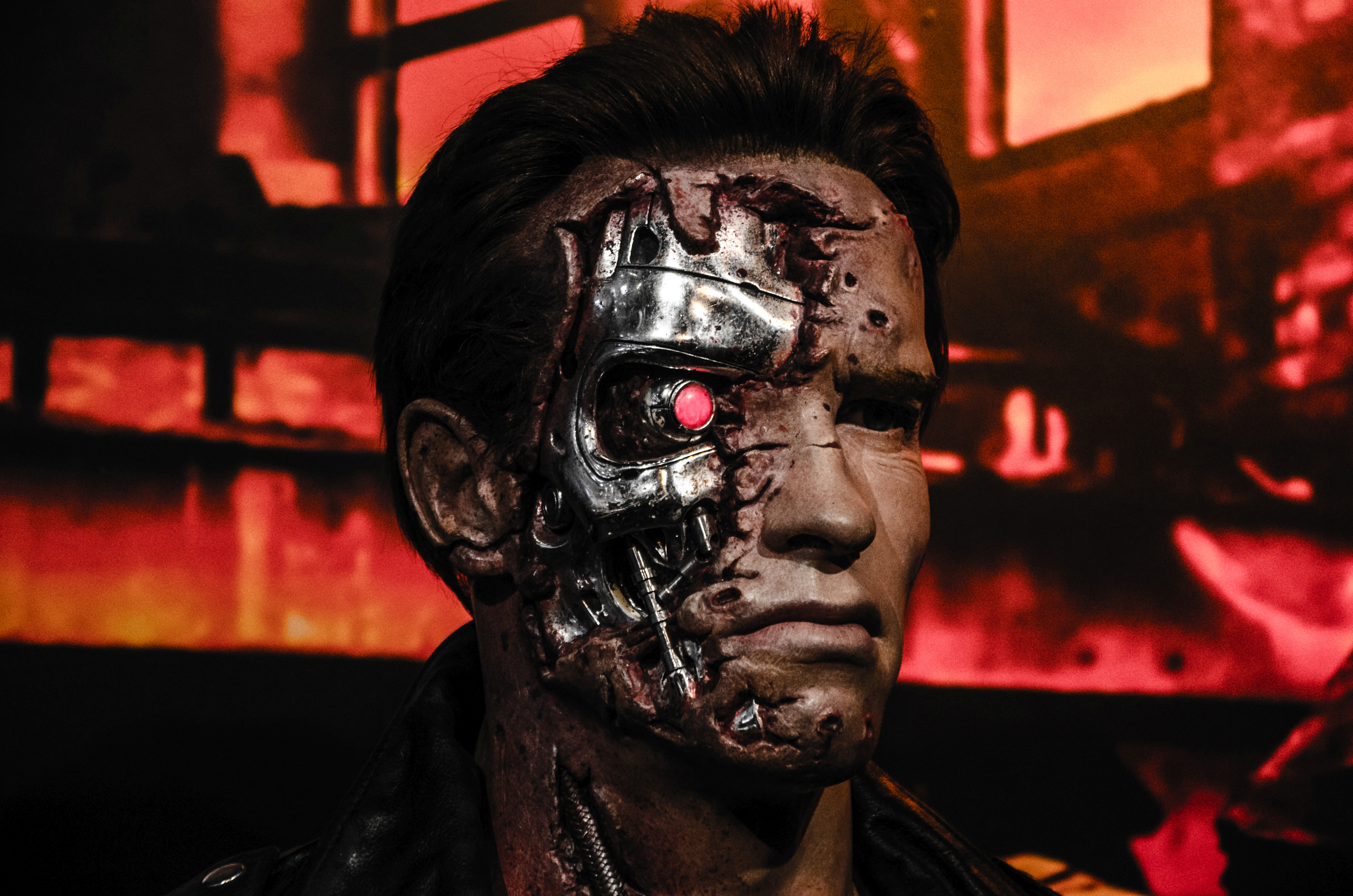
T-800

The original film The Terminator (1984) introduces a Cyberdyne Systems Model 101, also known as a T-800 and commonly referred to as simply the "Terminator". The character is portrayed by Arnold Schwarzenegger, who would return to play various incarnations of the machine throughout the film series. Originally an antagonist, the T-800 is usually depicted as a protector in later appearances.

Subsequent films have introduced other Terminator models:

- The T-1000 (portrayed by Robert Patrick) appears in Terminator 2: Judgment Day (1991). It is made of a liquid metal, described in the film as a mimetic polyalloy, which allows it to shapeshift into various people or objects. Unlike other Terminators, it lacks an endoskeleton. Another T-1000 (portrayed by Lee Byung-hun) appears in Terminator Genisys (2015).
- The T-X (portrayed by Kristanna Loken) appears in Terminator 3: Rise of the Machines (2003). It is the first Terminator to assume a female appearance for its default exterior. It has an endoskeleton as well as an exterior made of shapeshifting liquid metal, like the T-1000.
- The T-5000 (portrayed by Matt Smith) appears in Terminator Genisys (2015). The machine is controlled by Skynet, marking its first physical embodiment, and is capable of infecting others with nanotechnology.
- The Rev-9 (portrayed by Gabriel Luna) appears in Terminator: Dark Fate (2019). It has shapeshifting abilities and can split itself into two entities.

The films have also featured several humans who later become part machine:

- Terminator Salvation (2009) introduces Marcus Wright (portrayed by Sam Worthington), a death row inmate who agrees to have his body used for medical research after his execution. He later awakens in the post-apocalyptic future and discovers himself to now be a cyborg with a metal endoskeleton, though he has retained his brain, heart, and outer appearance.
- In Terminator Genisys, the shapeshifting T-3000 comes into existence after John Connor (portrayed by Jason Clarke) is infected by the T-5000.
- In Terminator: Dark Fate, Grace (portrayed by Mackenzie Davis) is a post-apocalyptic fighter who, at her insistence, is implanted with technology, giving her abilities such as enhanced strength.

A television series, titled Terminator: The Sarah Connor Chronicles (2008–09), introduces several new Terminator models. Among these are multiple T-888 antagonists, including one known as Cromartie (portrayed by Garret Dillahunt). Other Terminators include a shapeshifting T-1001 known as Catherine Weaver (portrayed by Shirley Manson), and an unknown model known as Cameron (portrayed by Summer Glau), a protector to John Connor.

An early model, the T-600, is referenced in the first film, noted as being easily spotted due to its rubber-skinned exterior. The T-600 makes its first appearance in The Sarah Connor Chronicles. Terminator Salvation features T-600s and T-700s, the latter also using rubber exteriors before Skynet upgrades to human tissue with the T-800. Both models also have a darker-colored endoskeleton and are larger compared with their successor.

=== Non-humanoid ===
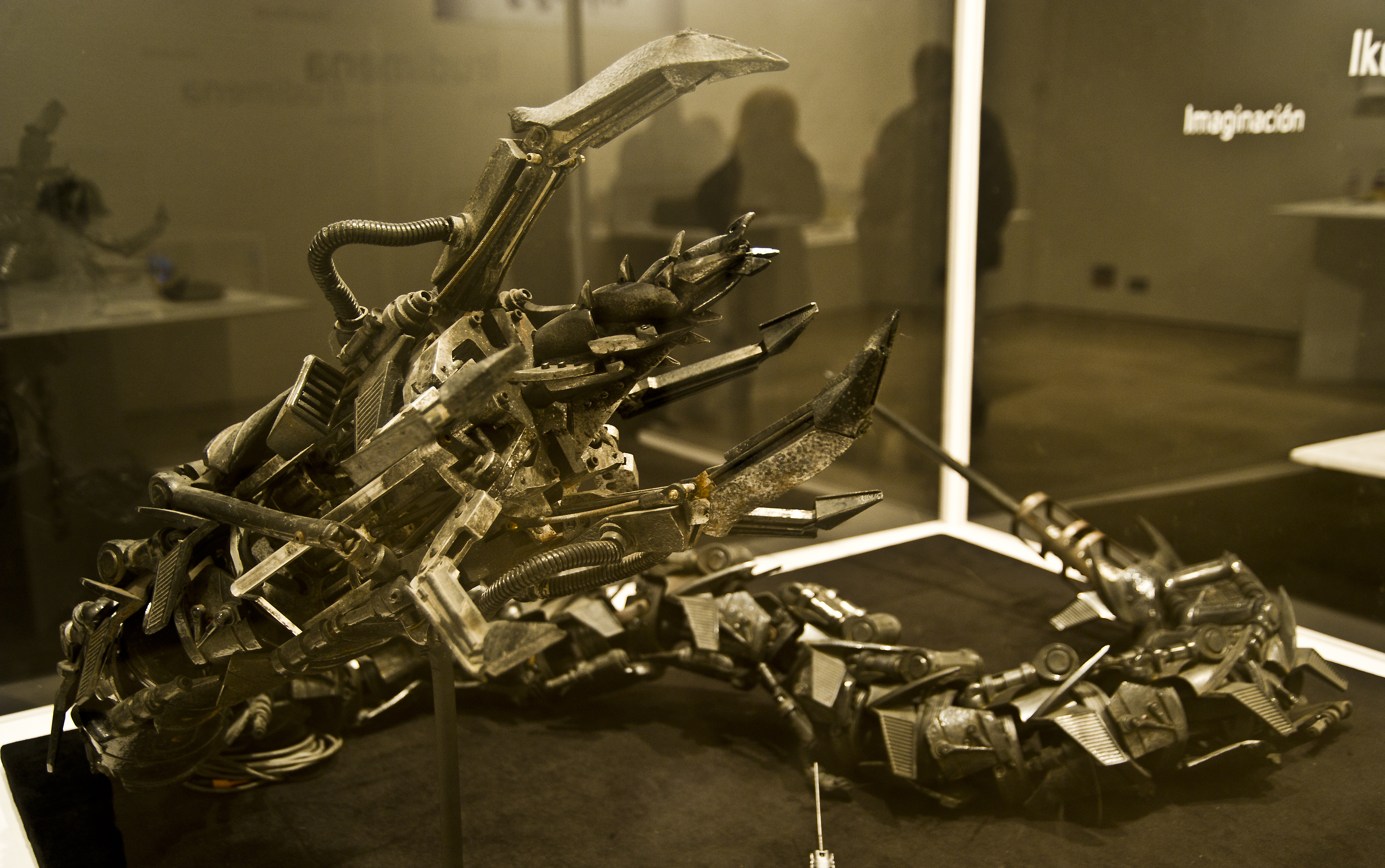
A Hydrobot from Terminator Salvation, on display at ExpoSYFY in Spain, 2013

Other machines, lacking a human appearance, have also appeared. These include Hunter-Killers (or HKs), which make appearances in the future war segments of the film series. Two types of HKs exist: ground-based tanks and aerial drones.

Terminator 3: Rise of the Machines briefly features the T-1, described as the earliest Terminator model by director Jonathan Mostow: "I wanted to depict the first generation of Terminator robots, to show where it all began. […] We came up with this primitive but deadly robotic machine that is part tank, part robot."

Terminator Salvation introduces a variety of new machines, including Aerostats which fly over areas looking for humans. Upon locating them, the Aerostats report back to the Harvester, a machine rising at least 50 feet. The Harvester is tasked with capturing the humans, and can smash into buildings to acquire them. The humans are then loaded into the Transporter, a flying machine which brings them to Skynet's facilities for research, which is then used to create the T-800. Terminator Salvation also introduces two other machines, both designed to kill humans: the Hydrobot, an amphibious snake-like vehicle; and motorcycles known as Moto-Terminators.

Terminator Genisys introduces an additional model, four-legged Spider Tanks, which are dropped by aerial HKs.

== Production background ==
The Terminator concept was originally conceived by James Cameron, director and writer of the first two films. Special effects artist Stan Winston and his crew provided practical Terminator effects for the original film, including the endoskeleton, and would return for the next three installments to provide further effects. Following Winston's death in 2008, a successor company was formed by his crew under the name Legacy Effects, which worked on Terminator Genisys. Industrial Light & Magic has also worked on the films since Terminator 2, providing computer-generated imagery of the machines for certain shots.
