= Miles Dyson =

Fictional character from the Terminator franchise

- Terminator character
- First appearance: Terminator 2: Judgment Day (1991)
- Last appearance: Terminator Genisys (2015)
- Created by: James Cameron; William Wisher Jr.
- Portrayed by: Joe Morton; (T2); Phil Morris; (The Sarah Connor Chronicles); Courtney B. Vance; (Genisys)

In-universe information
- Species: Human
- Gender: Male
- Title: Doctor
- Occupation: Scientist
- Spouse: Tarissa Dyson
- Children: Danny Dyson (son); Blythe Dyson (daughter)

Doctor Miles Bennett Dyson is a character in the sci-fi franchise Terminator. He is the original inventor of the microprocessor that would lead to the development of Skynet, an intelligent computer system intended to control the United States military, but which would later achieve sentience and launch a global war of extermination against humanity.

Dyson is portrayed by Joe Morton in Terminator 2: Judgment Day (T2), by Phil Morris in Terminator: The Sarah Connor Chronicles, and by Courtney B. Vance in Terminator Genisys.

== Fictional biography ==
=== Terminator 2: Judgment Day ===
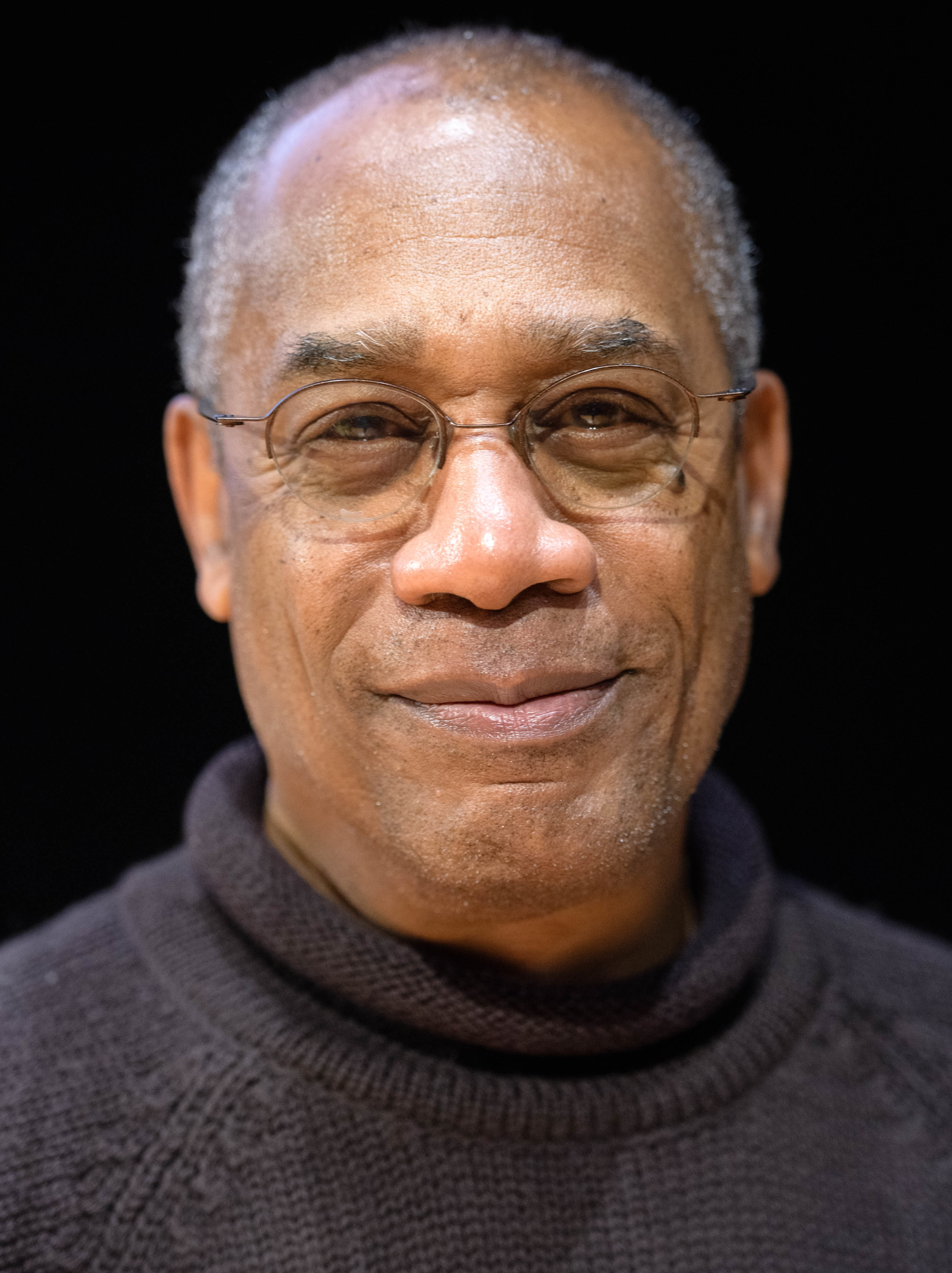
Joe Morton (pictured in 2019) portrays the character in Terminator 2: Judgment Day (1991)

Miles Dyson is an expert in cybernetics at Cyberdyne Systems Corporation as the Director of Special Projects. He has a wife named Tarissa and a son named Danny. Dyson is creating a microprocessor inspired by two pieces of highly advanced technology recovered from a Terminator in the first film. Dyson is the man most directly responsible for Skynet's creation, which would lead to Judgment Day. One night at his home, Dyson is suddenly attacked by Sarah Connor, who believed that Judgment Day could be averted by killing Dyson, thereby stopping development of the microprocessor. When Sarah comes to her senses and retreats, Dyson is saved by Sarah's son, John, and the Model 101 Terminator. To convince Dyson that it is a Terminator, the machine removes skin to reveal its mechanical arm, identical to another arm held at Cyberdyne's laboratory. The group explain to Dyson the nature of Skynet and what his work would lead to. Dyson initially states that he will quit working at Cyberdyne and destroy all of his research, only for the Model 101 to explain that as long as the technology remains at Cyberdyne, Judgment Day remains inevitable. Dyson agrees to accompany Sarah, John and the Terminator to Cyberdyne to destroy his research. After unwillingly forcing their way into Cyberdyne at gunpoint, Dyson assists John to gather the technology from his laboratory. Dyson also begins preparing to decimate the lab with a bomb. Just as the bomb is ready for detonation, SWAT team officers arrive and open fire, fatally wounding Dyson. Dyson holds onto the trigger and signals for the Connors, the Terminator, and the SWAT team to leave. Dyson dies of his injuries and detonates the bomb, destroying the building with his body inside.

=== Terminator Genisys ===
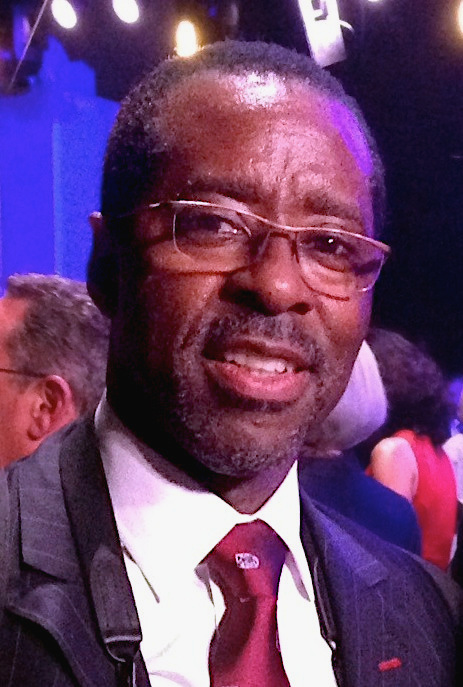
Courtney B. Vance (pictured in 2013) portrays the character in Terminator Genisys (2015).

Dyson returns in Terminator Genisys, which takes place in an alternate timeline where Judgment Day was delayed to the year 2017. In this timeline, Dyson is Cyberdyne's CEO, and though he did not create Skynet directly, he is funding a project called "Genisys", created by his son. Danny and John Connor (now psychopathic due to being turned into a cyborg designated the T-3000 Terminator), both replace him as Skynet's creators.

=== Terminator: The Sarah Connor Chronicles ===
Miles's wife, son and home appear in the pilot episode of this series, and although he appears in only the form of a family photograph, his part in Terminator 2 is mentioned. It is revealed that the FBI believes (incorrectly) that Sarah is responsible for his death, which explains his wife Tarissa's hostility towards her after they meet again in 1999, though they manage to convince her that she is innocent of the crime. In episode 3, his grave is visited by his wife and Sarah. Sarah asks her if she knew anything about some men involved in the creation of Skynet. Tarissa mentions one man who created a form of AI called "The Turk", a computer system capable of playing chess. In the photographs, Dyson is portrayed by Phil Morris.

=== T2 novels ===
In the T2 series of novels by S.M. Stirling, set after Judgment Day, Miles's brother, FBI agent Jordan Dyson, takes on the task of investigating Sarah Connor's activities, initially hunting her and John in the belief that they are responsible for his brother's death; even after Miles's wife reveals that the leader of the SWAT team that killed Miles has admitted his role in events—he was dying of cancer and wanted to apologize for his mistake—Jordan continues his vendetta because Miles would never have been in Cyberdyne if it were not for Sarah. When he finally learns the truth about the Terminators, he is initially skeptical, but later comes to believe the Connors' tales, helping them battle the latest Terminator incursion into the past after learning that Miles's work would lead to their creation.

== Commentary ==
Critic Sharon Willis has noted the significance of Miles Dyson:

Dyson's sacrifice lines up with the [T]erminator's as the necessary condition of [Sarah] Connor's reunion with her son... T2 literally immolates [Dyson and the Terminator] on the altar of a future conditioned by humanist values.

Willis comments on Connor's speech to Dyson:

Men like you... you think you're so creative," Connor continues. "You don't know what it's like to really create something, [...] to feel it growing inside you. All you know how to create is death and destruction.

== Legacy ==
Dyson has become one of the most iconic and notable creators of artificial technology in popular culture, along with Eldon Tyrell from Blade Runner and Tony Stark in Avengers: Age of Ultron. Morton ended up playing a similar role in the DC Extended Universe as Silas Stone, the father of Victor Stone/Cyborg who uses Mother Box technology in an attempt to save his son's life. Morton's portrayal of the role was revealed to have been a reference to Miles Dyson. Dyson has also been recognised as one of the most important characters in the Terminator franchise, due to his accidental creation of Skynet and his willingness to do whatever it takes to change the future, including sacrificing his own life.

Dyson has also been compared to Victor Frankenstein and The Terminator to Frankenstein's Monster, where Dyson experimented with technologies beyond his understanding and inadvertently created life which turned evil, somewhat similar to how Dr. Frankenstein experimented with life beyond death and created a monster. There are noticeable differences between Dyson and Frankenstein. Dyson was unaware that his work would create Skynet, whereas Frankenstein fully intended on creating new life, but did not intend on creating a monster.
