= T-3000 =

T-3000 (John Connor)
- Terminator character
- The T-3000 endoskeleton in Terminator Genisys (2015)
- First appearance: Terminator Genisys (2015)
- Last appearance: Terminator Genisys: Future War (2017)
- Created by: Laeta Kalogridis; Patrick Lussier
- Based on: John Connor by: James Cameron; Gale Anne Hurd; William Wisher Jr.
- Portrayed by: Jason Clarke

In-universe information
- Full name: John Connor
- Species: Cyborg (based on an originally human subject)
- Gender: Male
- Occupation: Skynet: Assassin; Infiltrator; Cyberdyne Systems: Computer coder Roboticist
- Affiliation: Skynet; Cyberdyne Systems
- Family: Sarah Connor (mother); Kyle Reese (father; adoptive son)
- Manufacturer: Skynet
- Model: T-3000

The T-3000 is a fictional character and the main antagonist of Terminator Genisys, the fifth installment in the Terminator series, portrayed by Jason Clarke. In the film, the T-3000 is an alternate timeline counterpart of Skynet's (portrayed by Matt Smith) nemesis John Connor (also portrayed by Clarke), created after Skynet infects a variant of Connor with nanotechnology and fractures the timeline. The T-3000 also serves as a foil personality to "Guardian" (a reprogrammed T-800 portrayed by Arnold Schwarzenegger), a protagonist who is somewhat similar to the T-3000 but also opposite in many ways, of their relationship dynamics with Sarah Connor (portrayed by Emilia Clarke) and Kyle Reese (portrayed by Jai Courtney).

The T-3000's sole mission is to protect and ensure the ultimate survival of Skynet, which seeks to eliminate the human race with its global machine network. The T-3000 describes itself as neither machine nor human; rather, it is a hybrid nanotechnological cyborg. Producer David Ellison explains that the title Terminator Genisys "[is] in reference to genesis, which is in reference to the singularity and the man-machine hybrid that John Connor ends up being." The T-3000 returns in the 2017 video game Terminator Genisys: Future War, a direct sequel to Genisys produced following the cancellation of the film's planned sequels in favor of another alternate timeline-set sequel, Terminator: Dark Fate (2019).

== Background ==
In a desperate effort to ensure its survival, the rogue artificial intelligence Skynet creates an avatar for itself in the form of a T-5000 (Matt Smith). This Terminator travels through many timelines searching for a way to defeat the Human Resistance and ultimately infiltrates it under the guise of a fighter named Alex. "Alex" is present as a soldier when John Connor and Kyle Reese (Jai Courtney) discover Skynet's time machine at the end of the war with the machines. As Kyle is being sent back in time to protect John's mother Sarah Connor (Emilia Clarke) from the T-800 Terminator sent to kill her in 1984, "Alex" carries out his attack. He kills all of the other soldiers nearby and infects John Connor with nanomachines, transforming him into a new hybrid Terminator designated as the T-3000. Skynet had attempted to convert other humans in this manner, intended to be a new type of infiltrator as prisoners were infected with machine-phase matter to convert them into a new form of Terminator. However, these test subjects were always driven insane by the psychological trauma of the experience; Connor is the only known human with the strength of will to come through the experience reasonably psychologically intact, albeit now corrupted so that he will serve Skynet rather than humanity.

John Connor's conversion into a Terminator as Kyle travels back in time turns out to be such a major event that it causes a grandfather paradox that fractures the timeline, completely rewriting the past and the future.

The T-3000 is sent back in time to 2014, and given the mission to assist Cyberdyne Systems in developing a new operating system named Genisys, in addition to revolutionary robotic and time traveling technology, which is in reality Skynet and the recreation of its machines. When Sarah and Kyle arrive in 2017, he meets them at a hospital and convinces them that he is John Connor, but his disguise is exposed by the Guardian (a reprogrammed T-800 portrayed by Schwarzenegger). The T-3000 engages the trio in multiple destructive battles. During a final battle with the Guardian, the T-3000 is disintegrated by a prototype time machine's magnetic field. However, despite Skynet's global attack being foiled, the T-3000 succeeded in securing its survival in this timeline.

== Design ==
The on-screen representation of the T-3000 was made by British effects company Double Negative. Footage would combine Jason Clarke filmed on set, keyframed animation, and motion capture. Supervisor Peter Bebb said that the company tried to design the T-3000 like a computer would do it, focusing on design and battle efficiency, "form follows function". Given that it is a Terminator built out of a human, the result is "a pure robot that sits under flesh structure", still retaining an overall human shape. The mechanical cells tried to resemble the material on stealth aircraft, with a result described as "more matte than metal", resembling a slightly iridescent ceramic carbon.

== Abilities ==
The Guardian identifies the T-3000 as being made of machine-phase matter (essentially, programmable matter) held together by a magnetic field. Because of this, the T-3000's abilities far exceed those of the T-1000 and other Terminator models. It is capable of shapeshifting at much more rapid speed than the mimetic polyalloy Terminators, though it is still limited by complexity or mass; its transformation abilities are such that it can dissolve itself into a cloud while falling head-first through the air, reorient itself to land on its feet and be fully transformed back to normal by the time it stands up. Likewise, it is capable of regenerating from almost any injury in mere moments. Unlike previous Terminators, the T-3000 transforms and regenerates in layers, beginning with its bone structure, then muscle tissue, skin and clothing; the phase matter can also simulate blood if necessary for infiltration. These layers can be adjusted independently of each other, as shown when John Connor adds and removes his facial scar at will in the film. It is unclear if the T-3000 can infect other humans and create more T-3000s; it offers this to Sarah and Kyle, but does not clarify if it will convert them itself and never attempts to forcibly do so, even when given an opportunity to. The transformation, which is described as replacing its victim's body on the cellular level, cannot be reversed.

Though a powerful enemy, the T-3000 is not invincible. Because its abilities are primarily tied to its magnetic field, it is susceptible to magnetic attacks that disrupt said field. Weaker magnetism from devices such as the Guardian's improvised fist-load weapons are capable of disrupting or disabling the T-3000's shapeshifting and regeneration abilities, due to affecting its ability to manipulate its particles. A sufficiently strong magnetic field can pull the T-3000 apart briefly to restrain it, and, if its body is exposed to a powerful magnetic field for a sustained amount of time, the cyborg can be torn apart and destroyed. The machine-phase matter is also vulnerable to the laser used in shaping mimetic polyalloy for use in the construction of T-1000s. If struck by this laser, the T-3000 can suffer enough external damage to render its outermost layer irreparably compromised, forcing it to discard its human appearance and use its true machine form. The T-3000 is still susceptible to some degrees of physical injuries and pains such as being wounded by gunshot, and its agonies can worsen if being marred by SWAT-standard breaching rounds since they typically are magnetic; the explosive ones are more effective against the cyborg for minutes of impairment. It is also shown to experience pain and have its movements impaired when trapped in an electrical current. However, these effects are only temporary due to its regeneration capabilities, which heal it once it manages to escape the current.

== See also ==
- Human enhancement
- Nanotechnology
- Nanotechnology in fiction
- Posthuman
- Quantum field
- Self-assembly of nanoparticles
- Time travel
- Transhumanism
- Utility fog
