= Kyle Reese =

Fictional character in the Terminator franchise

- Terminator character
- Michael Biehn as Kyle Reese in The Terminator (1984)
- First appearance: The Terminator (1984)
- Last appearance: Terminator: Resistance – Annihilation Line (2019)
- Created by: James Cameron; Gale Anne Hurd
- Portrayed by: Adult: Michael Biehn (The Terminator, T2 Extended Edition); Jai Courtney (Genisys); Young: Anton Yelchin (Salvation); Bryant Prince (Genisys)

In-universe information
- Gender: Male
- Title: Sergeant
- Occupation: Resistance soldier
- Affiliation: Resistance
- Family: John Connor (adoptive father, Terminator: Infinity comics); Tara Holden (adoptive mother); Dennis Reese (father); Mary Shea (mother); Derek Reese (brother); Tim Reese (brother)
- Significant other: Sarah Connor (girlfriend/ Mother of son)
- Children: John Connor (son biological)
- Origin: Los Angeles, United States (b. ~2004, d. 1984)

Kyle Reese is a fictional character created by James Cameron in the Terminator franchise. He is the protagonist of the first film and a supporting role in other works. Kyle Reese is portrayed by actor Michael Biehn in The Terminator (1984) and Terminator 2: Judgment Day (1991), Jonathan Jackson in Terminator: The Sarah Connor Chronicles (2008–2009), Anton Yelchin in Terminator Salvation (2009), and Jai Courtney in Terminator Genisys (2015).

== Production background ==
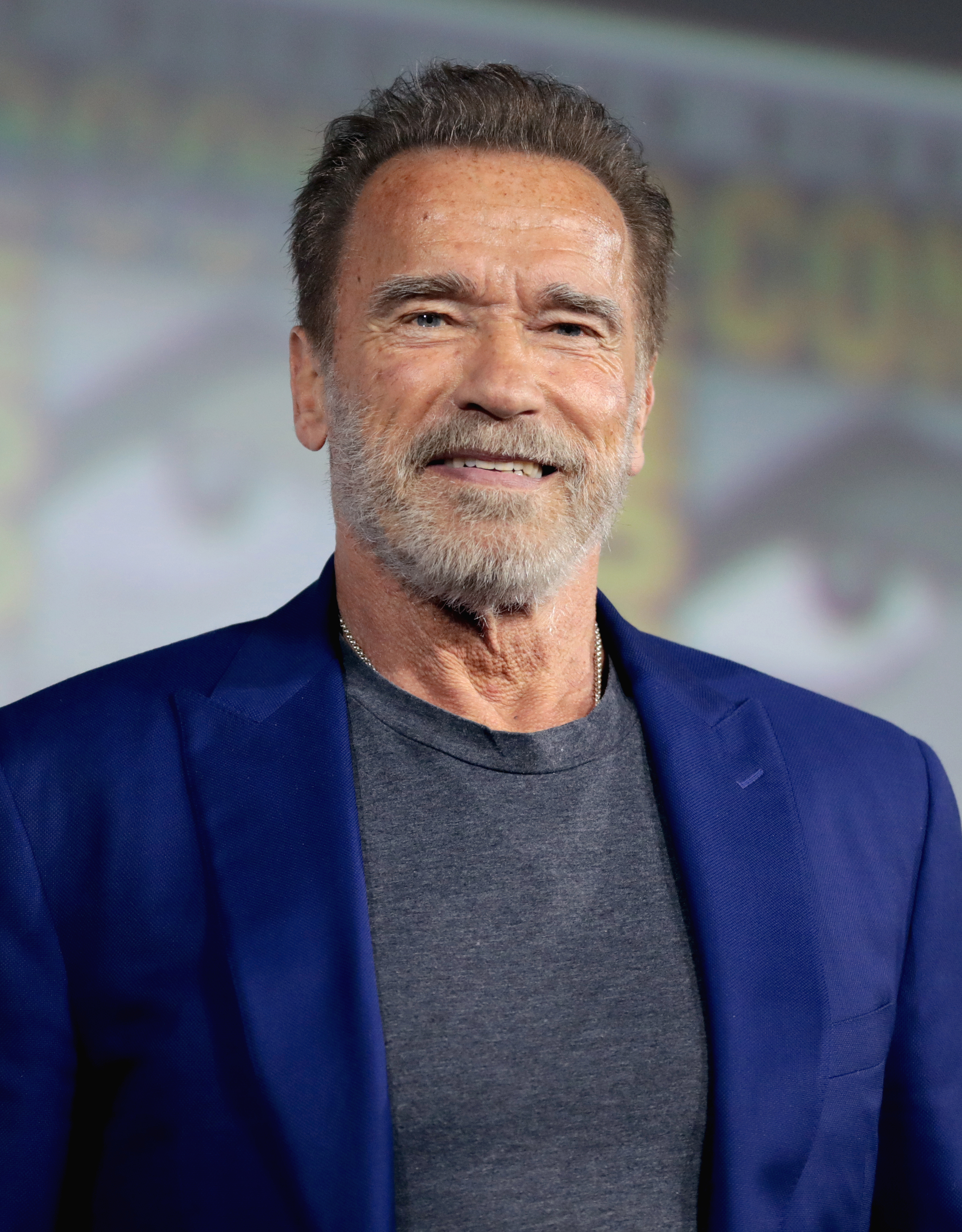
Arnold Schwarzenegger was suggested by the production studio

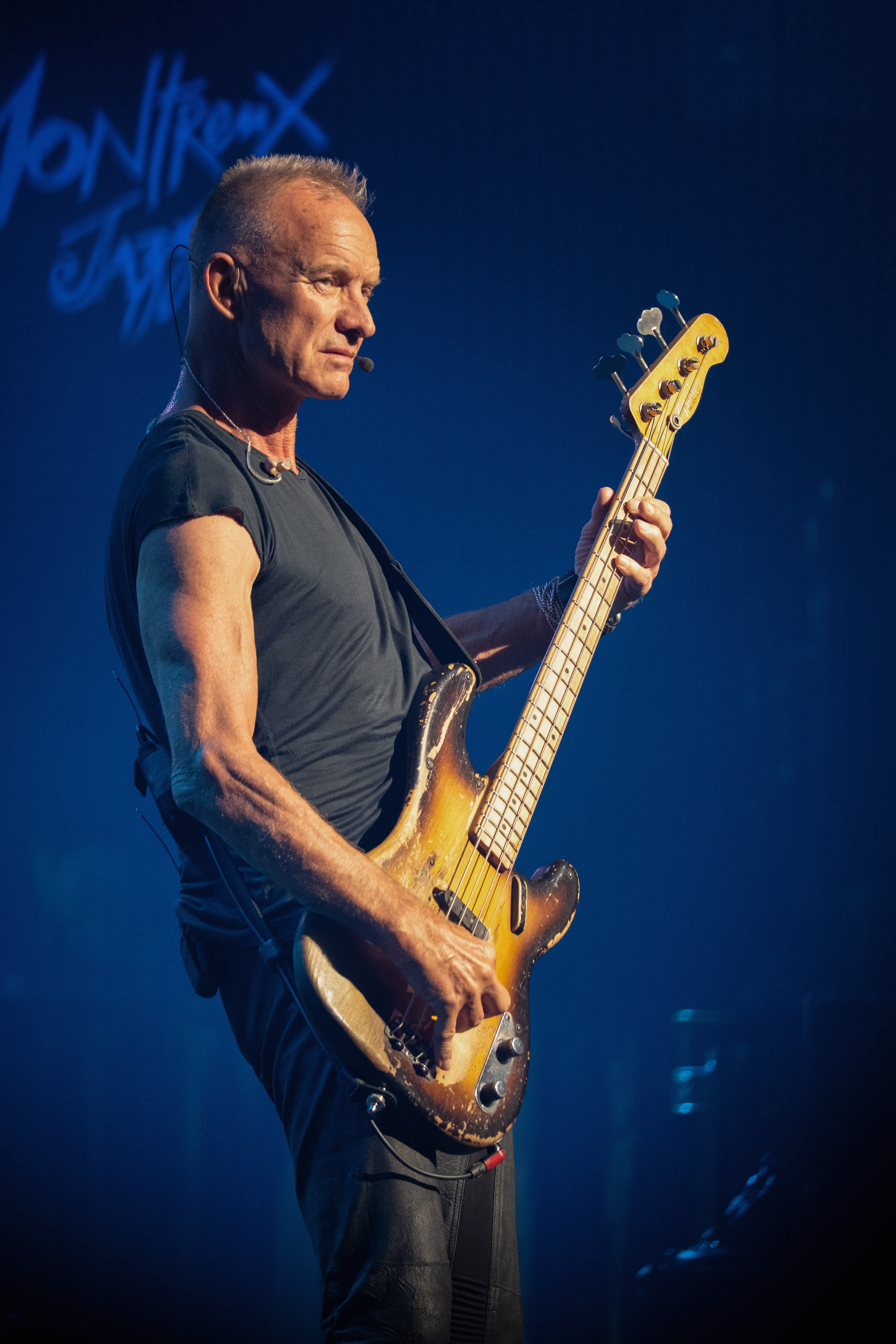
Sting was offered the role

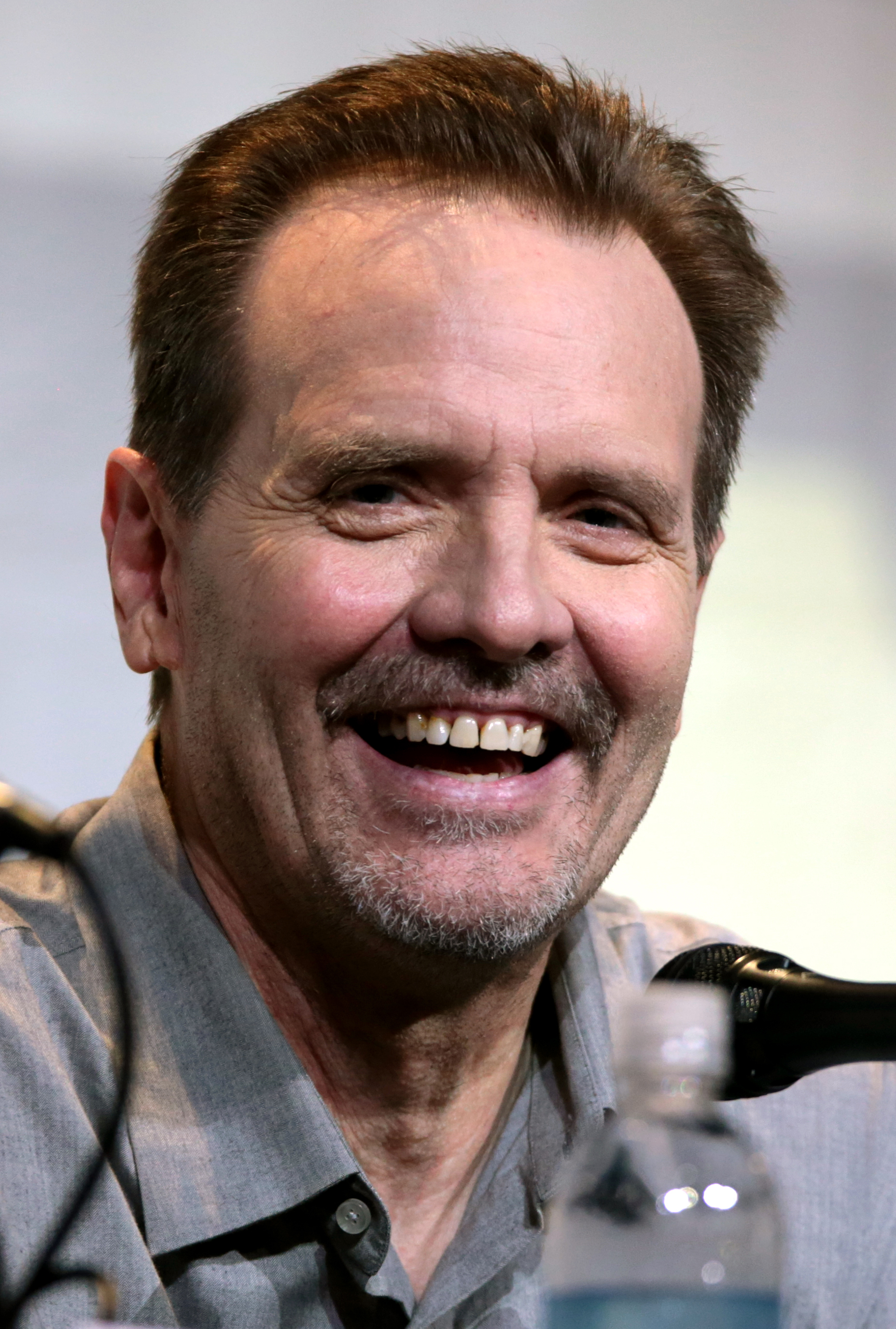
Michael Biehn

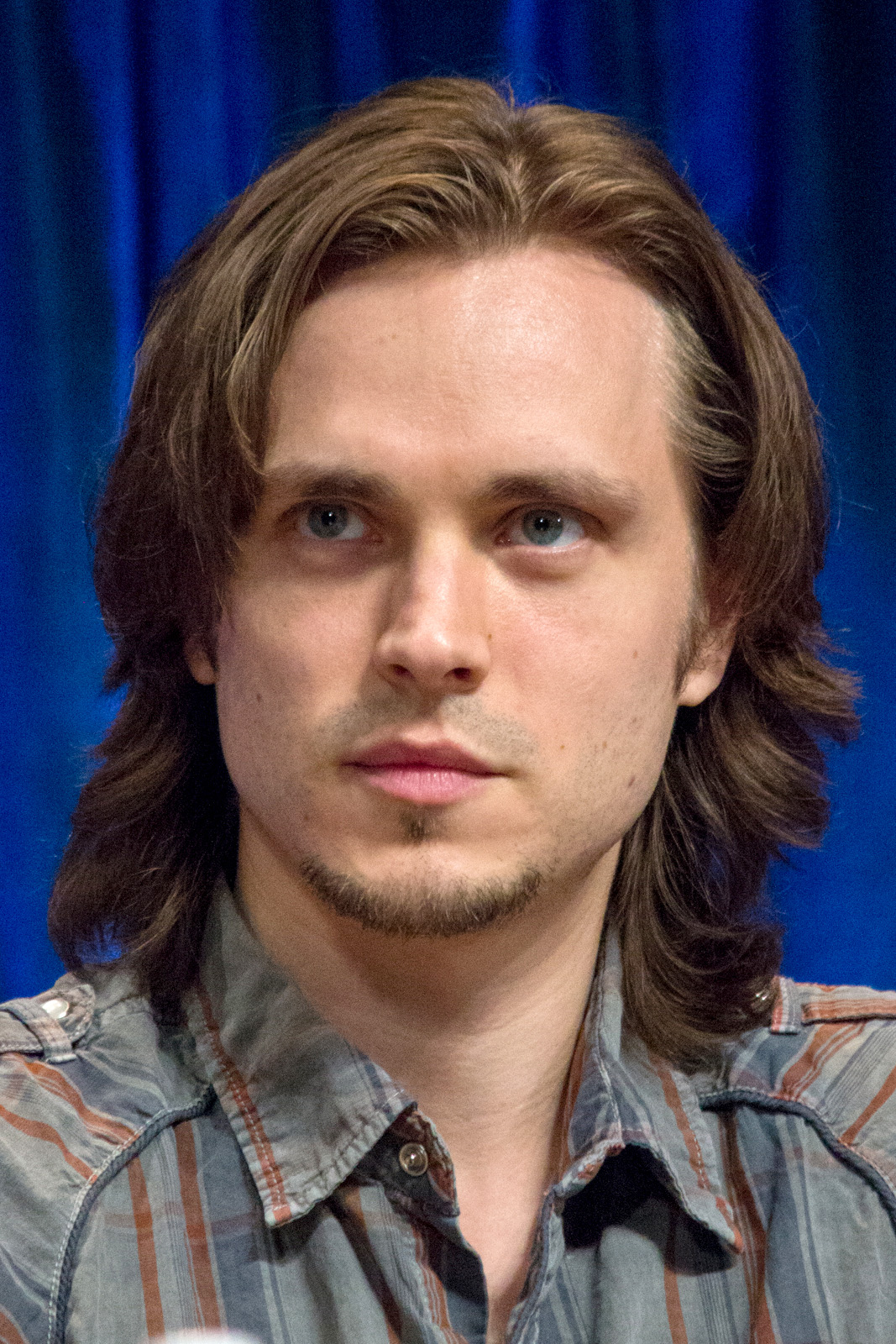
Jonathan Jackson

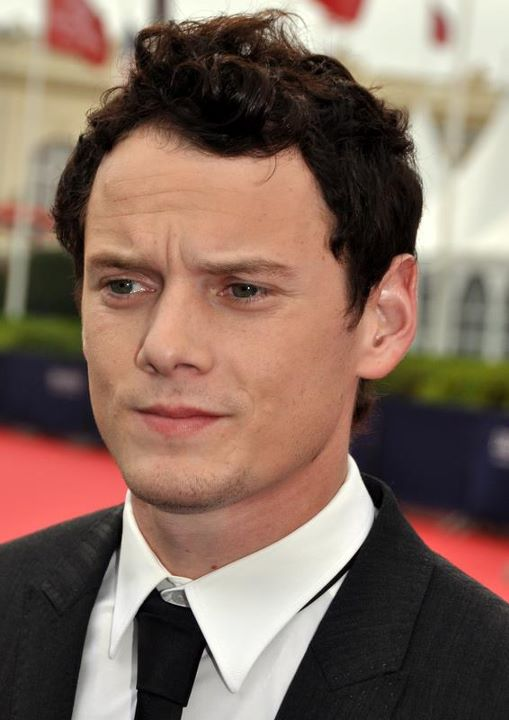
Anton Yelchin

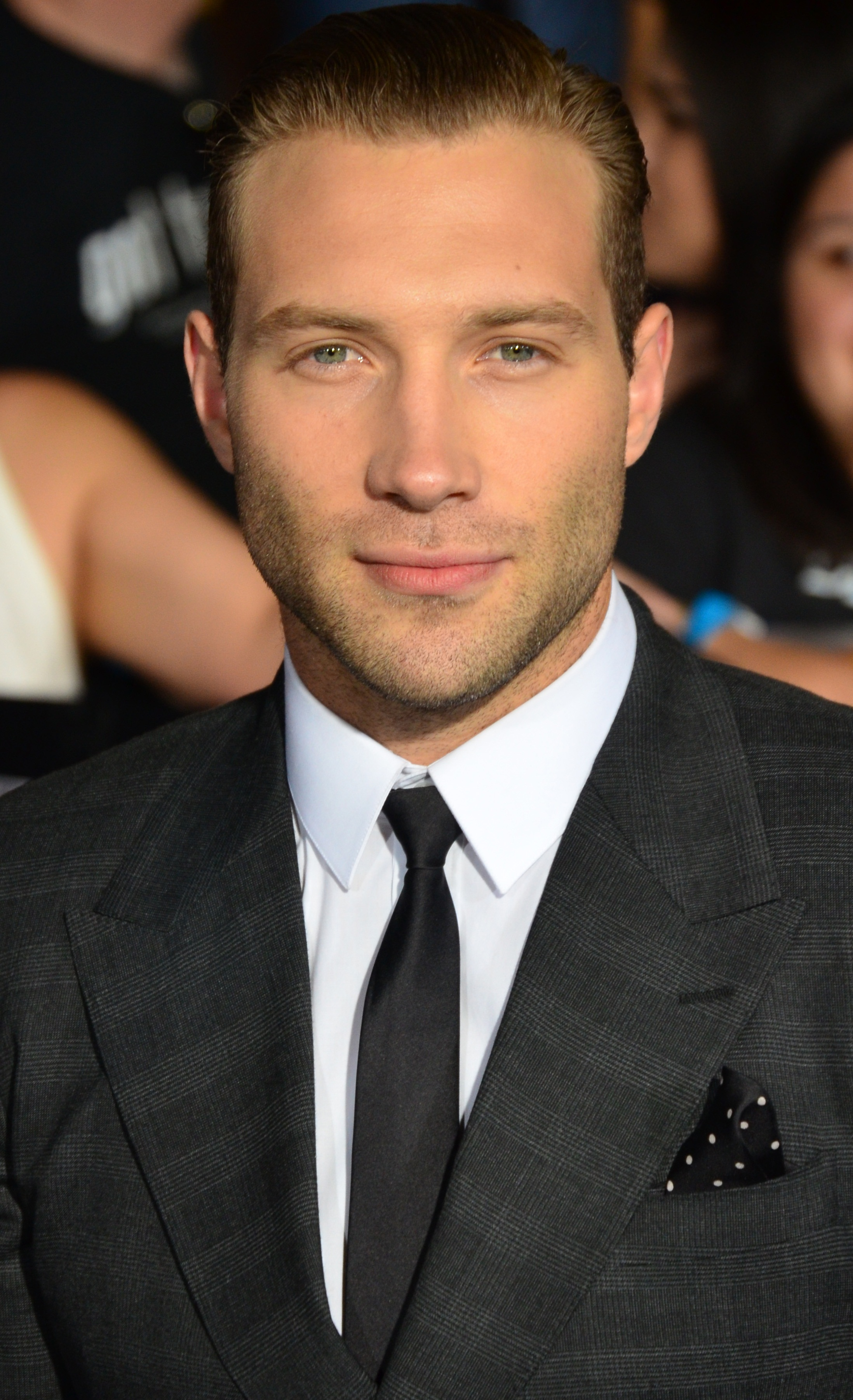
Jai Courtney

James Cameron's original script portrayed Reese and another soldier, named "Sumner", as sent to protect Sarah from the Terminator, but Sumner died upon arriving after the time portal fused him into a fire escape (the first two sequels show the time displacement field melting through whatever object is in the way; e.g. Terminator 2: Judgment Day shows the field melt a hole in a chain link fence when the T-1000 arrives, and obliterate part of a semi truck when the T-800 arrives). In this original script, Reese says to Dr. Silberman, "The Terminator had already gone through. Connor sent two of us to intercept it, then zeroed the whole place, but Sumner didn't make it." Sumner would later appear in a Sarah Connor Chronicles episode and make it alive through the time portal with Kyle's brother and two other Resistance time-traveling agents.

The actor Arnold Schwarzenegger was the original choice to play Reese, but director James Cameron ultimately decided to cast him as the Terminator instead. According to Schwarzenegger, O. J. Simpson was one of the first choices to play the Terminator opposite Schwarzenegger's Reese, but Cameron decided against it on the basis that Simpson would not be believable to audiences as a killer.

Michael Biehn almost did not get the role of Reese because, at his audition, he spoke in a Southern accent after having just auditioned for a role in a stage production of Cat on a Hot Tin Roof earlier that day and could not shake the accent. The producers did not want Reese to have an accent. After Biehn's agent explained the situation to the producers, he got a second audition and won the part. The original scriptment gave Reese's age as 21, while a later draft gave his age as 22. In real life, Biehn was 27 years old at the time that he was cast as Reese.

In Terminator 2: Judgment Day, actor Michael Biehn reprises the role of Kyle Reese; Sarah Connor, under heavy sedation, imagines him visiting her in a mental institution. Largely unchanged from his appearance in the first film, he embraces her and implores her to go to their son's aid, reminding her that "the future is not set." This scene was removed for the original theatrical release, but restored to the extended editions.

== Reception ==
Actor Michael Biehn's performance was met positively with critics, highlighting his ability to develop Reese's wounded core and longing despite the fast-paced nature of James Cameron's first film and for playing the heroic role "unusually sensitive".

Anton Yelchin's performance in Salvation was also praised, described as "spirited" and being the film's "secret weapon".

Jai Courtney, however, was universally considered miscast, described as a "dull-witted meathead" compared to Biehn's "skinny, bright-eyed, and very sweet" Kyle. Criticism was also made of Courtney's acting, total lack of charisma and over strong physique for an actor playing a character supposed to have grown up often starving in a nuclear wasteland.

== Terminator film series ==
Reese is a soldier in the Human Resistance in the post-apocalyptic future of The Terminator (1984), where most of humanity has been wiped out by a deadly nuclear war on August 29, 1997, which was sparked off by an artificial intelligence known as Skynet. The survivors fight extinction against the sentient computer system's genocidal war on humanity. The resistance is led by John Connor, under whom Reese serves.

In The Terminator (1984) and Terminator Genisys (2015), Skynet sends one of its most feared machines, the Model 101/T-800 Terminator, to pre-apocalypse Los Angeles, California on May 12, 1984, to assassinate John Connor's mother, Sarah Connor to prevent his birth. Reese volunteers to travel back to 1984 and intercept the Terminator.

=== Backstory ===
According to Terminator Genisys, Kyle Reese was born in 2004. He eventually becomes a sergeant (dog tag number DN38416), working in the Tech-Com facility of the Resistance. He served with the 132nd under Perry, from 2021 to 2027. He is one of the personal soldiers to John Connor, and is often selected for personal infiltrator missions by John.

Reese learned to make explosives as a child. He also assisted in stealing and reverse-engineering most of the Skynet technology, conducting raids on armories and stealing most of the laser-rifle equipment with his troops for the Resistance, along with the time-traveling technology that Skynet had developed.

=== The Terminator (1984) ===
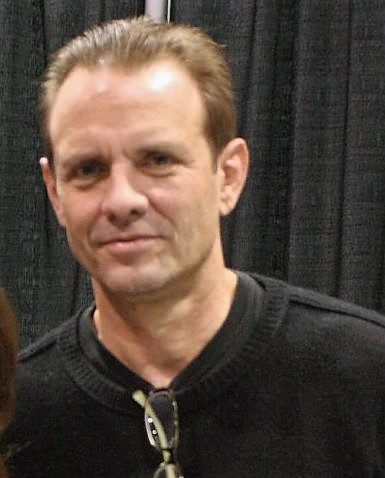
Michael Biehn (pictured in 2008) portrayed Kyle Reese in The Terminator (1984) and deleted scenes of Terminator 2: Judgment Day (1991).

In 2029, Skynet has been defeated by the Human Resistance, but manages to send one of its infiltrators back in time to assassinate Sarah Connor before she can give birth to John Connor; the Human Resistance decides to send a soldier back to defeat the Terminator and protect Sarah's life. Reese personally volunteers for a one-way mission back to pre-apocalypse Los Angeles to save her. Before he had been sent back, he was told that the time displacement equipment would be destroyed, stranding him and the Terminator in 1984.

Arriving naked and unarmed, and not knowing what the Terminator looks like in its human disguise, Reese steals clothes and a police-issue shotgun. He locates and follows Sarah (Linda Hamilton), shadowing her until the Model 101 (Arnold Schwarzenegger) attempts to carry out its mission. Reese rescues her from the Terminator's attacks in a nightclub and in a police station, warning her of the impending doom of the human race and of the future significance carried by her and her unborn son.

Though initially hostile toward Reese, Sarah grows to trust him as he becomes the only thing between her and the Terminator. The two grow closer as they continue to run from the Terminator and Kyle eventually reveals that he volunteered for the mission. Though battle-hardened and world-weary, Reese had fallen deeply in love with Sarah, a woman he had only known through a photo given to him by John, and traveled back in time to meet her. After Reese tells Sarah of this history, the two consummate their relationship and ultimately conceive John. The Terminator tracks them down and chases them through Los Angeles; Reese is wounded by gunfire but manages to blow up a fuel truck driven by the Terminator before it can run over Sarah. However, its now-bare metal endoskeleton emerges from the fire and pursues them into an automated factory. Reese attempts to fight the Terminator but is overpowered, though he manages to wedge the last of his homemade pipe bombs into its chassis and set it off; the explosion kills Reese and blows the Terminator apart. The machine's upper body continues to crawl after Sarah, who crushes it with a hydraulic press to stop it once and for all. Later, while being loaded into an ambulance, Sarah watches Reese's body be wheeled away by first responders.

=== Terminator 2: Judgment Day (1991) ===
Sarah continues to love Reese and mourn his death. During one of her constant nightmares about the nuclear war, Reese appears in a dream state version of her cell in Pescadero State Hospital and reminds her of the coming danger, and the need to protect their son, John Connor (Edward Furlong) in a deleted scene. However, as Reese begins to walk out of the cell, Sarah desperately follows him only to be led to a playground of kids playing before Skynet's nuclear weapons hit Los Angeles, which leaves Sarah waking up in shock still in her cell. Though this scene was cut from the theatrical version, it was later restored for home video releases.

Reese is later mentioned by John himself, who admits to the Terminator protecting him from the T-1000 that despite Sarah's tough exterior, she still loves Reese and he often sees her crying for him. John expresses his own regret for never having the chance to meet Reese in person. The Terminator assures John that one day he will.

=== Terminator Salvation (2009) ===
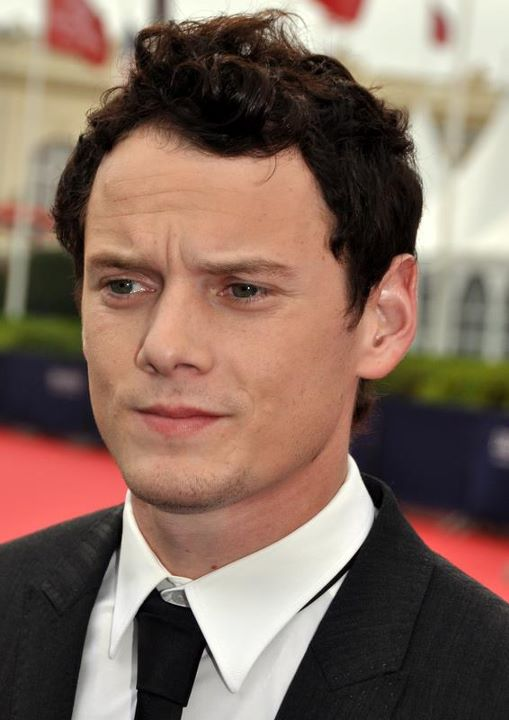
Anton Yelchin (pictured in 2011) portrayed younger Kyle Reese in Terminator Salvation (2009).

Kyle Reese is portrayed as a teenager by Anton Yelchin in Terminator Salvation. The film takes place in 2018, and it revolves around his first meeting with his future son John (Christian Bale). As a teenager, Kyle was the leader of the Los Angeles Resistance cell, even though it only consisted of two people. Because of this, he aspires to join the formal Resistance regulars, who mark themselves with a red stripe on their left sleeve, once he has "earned it".

It is clear that Kyle is immediately drawn to the charismatic figure of John Connor because he leaves his Los Angeles base after hearing the latter's Resistance broadcast. Inspired by Connor's example, he frequently quotes segments of the broadcasts and adapts strategies that Connor suggests for taking down Terminators. He similarly shares a unique bond with Marcus Wright (Sam Worthington), who helps hone Kyle's strategies in close-quarters combat, whereas Kyle's lectures on what humans are fighting for reminds Marcus of his humanity.

In the film, Kyle's father had initially survived Judgment Day but died prior to the events of the movie. Due to the original Terminator failing to kill Sarah and the T-1000 and the T-X failing to kill John in the past, Kyle has become Skynet's primary target in order to stop him from traveling back in time to protect Sarah in the first place, as well as using him to lure John into a trap. In the film, Kyle is already working with and protecting a child named Star (Jadagrace Berry) when the two later save Marcus from a T-600 attack in the ruins of Los Angeles.

After Skynet captures him outside of Los Angeles, Reese, upon escaping, later works with John and Marcus building a bomb to destroy Skynet's San Francisco command. The two also fight the first T-800 model, though John tricks him into leaving the facility without him. Marcus eventually defeats the T-800 by tearing its head off and escapes the base with John and Reese before they detonate the bombs, destroying the facility and taking thousands of unfinished T-800s with it, changing the future for the better. At the end of the film, Reese is promoted to resistance soldier and becomes part of John's inner circle consisting primarily of Kate Brewster, Blair Williams and Barnes.

=== Terminator Genisys (2015) ===
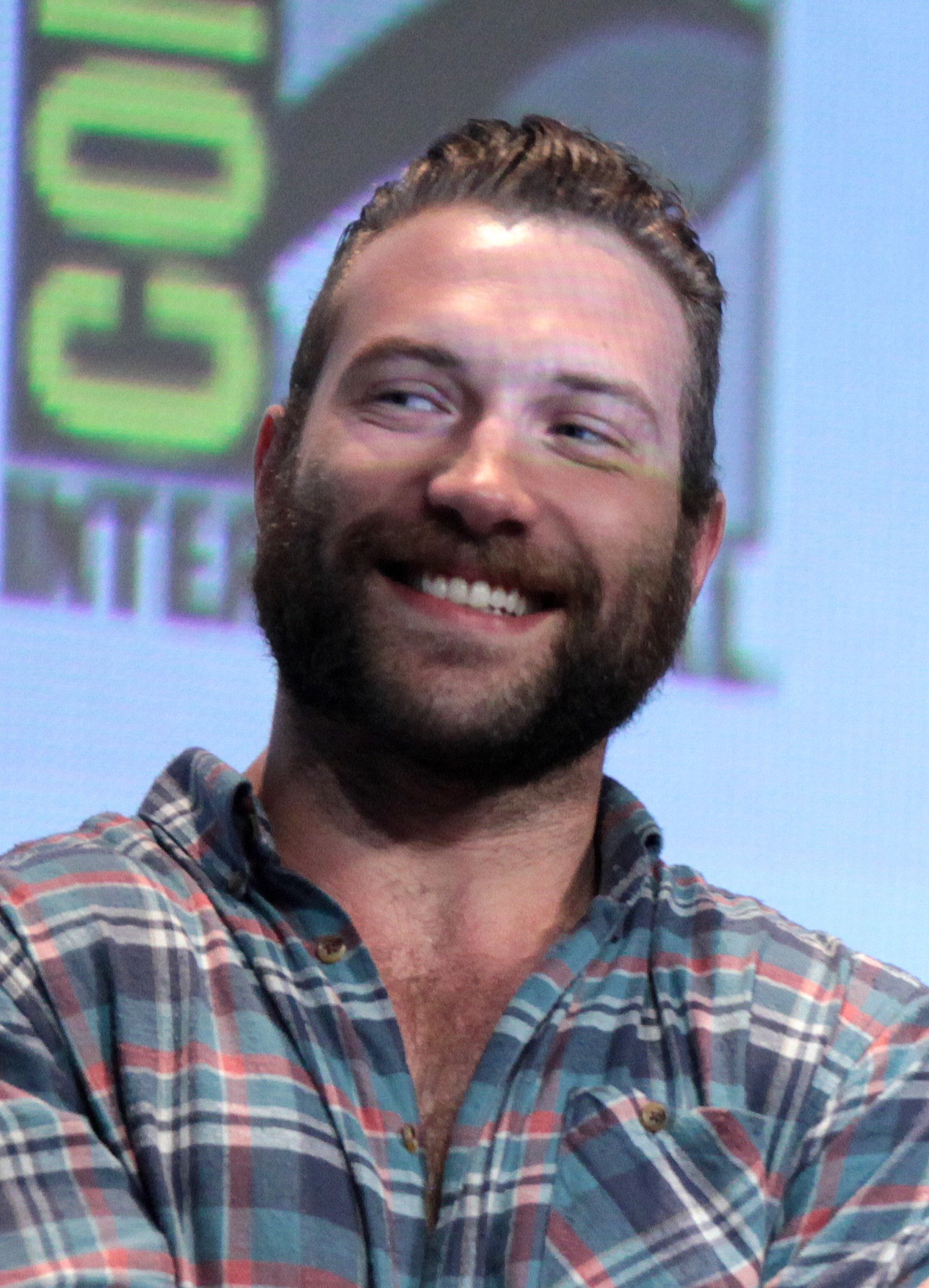
Jai Courtney portrayed Kyle Reese in Terminator Genisys (2015).

Reese is portrayed by Jai Courtney in Terminator Genisys, and by Bryant Prince as Reese's 12-year-old self. His history is similar to James Cameron's established canon and is John Connor's (Jason Clarke) lieutenant. In the film, it is revealed that Reese is of Irish descent on his mother's side, and as the film serves as a reboot of the series instead of a sequel to Salvation, Reese is depicted as having been found as a child by Connor himself, and his interactions with Star and Marcus Wright are absent.

In 2029, Connor sends Reese back through time to protect Sarah Connor (Emilia Clarke). As he is being sent back, he witnesses Connor being attacked by Skynet (in its physical form) and a temporal paradox occurs before Kyle reaches his destination. He discovers that Sarah Connor has been raised and trained by a reprogrammed T-800 (Schwarzenegger), creating an alternate timeline and thus making Kyle a remnant of the previous one. In the changed timeline, Skynet has transformed John into a T-3000 tasked with ensuring Genisys - this timeline's precursor to Skynet - becomes active. At the same time, Reese continues to exist, as his parents still met (though under different circumstances), and it is his knowledge of Genisys through his new memories before the timeline's change that enables them to travel forward to 2017 instead of 1997. The reprogrammed T-800, Sarah, and Reese defeat Genisys and the T-3000/John, and Reese meets his 12-year-old equivalent in the active timeline and instructs him to repeat a warning mantra each morning, deliberately creating a temporal causal loop to ensure he already knows his task in the future.

=== Terminator: Dark Fate (2019) ===
Director Tim Miller stated that Kyle Reese does not exist in the new modern-day alternate timeline that is depicted in the 2019 film Terminator: Dark Fate, because unlike the Genisys timeline, where Reese's parents still met and conceived him despite Judgment Day not yet occurring, in the Dark Fate timeline, his parents did not cross paths.

== Terminator: The Sarah Connor Chronicles (2008–2009) ==
Kyle Reese
- Terminator: The Sarah Connor Chronicles character
- First appearance: "Dungeons & Dragons" (2008)
- Last appearance: "Born to Run" (2009)
- Created by: James Cameron; Josh Friedman; Ashley Edward Miller; Zack Stentz
- Portrayed by: Jonathan Jackson; Skyler Gisondo (young)

In the parallel universe television show, Terminator: The Sarah Connor Chronicles, it is revealed that Reese has an older brother named Derek, who becomes one of the show's main characters. He is also a Resistance soldier from the future.

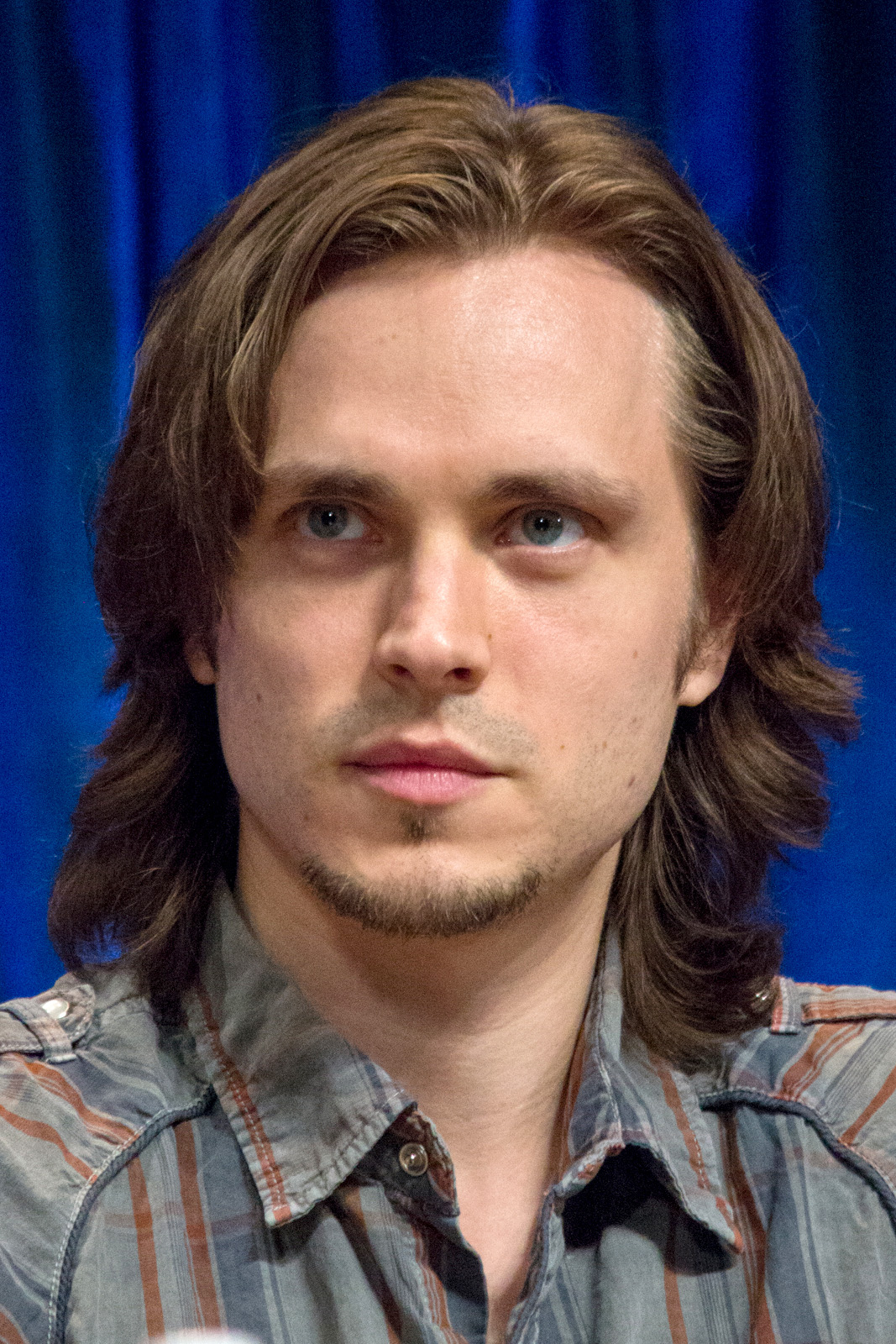
Jonathan Jackson (pictured in 2013) portrayed Kyle Reese in Terminator: The Sarah Connor Chronicles (2008–09).

=== Characterization ===
In this series, Kyle Reese is played by Jonathan Jackson in the episode "Dungeons & Dragons" which details how he and his brother are separated during a recon mission before he made his trip through time to protect Sarah Connor; further details are in the episode "Goodbye to All That" of the second season, during Derek's recollection of the future war. An eight-year-old version of Kyle Reese, portrayed by Skyler Gisondo, briefly appears in the episode "What He Beheld" when Derek Reese takes John Connor out for ice cream on his 16th birthday.

They find a younger Kyle and Derek playing baseball at the park, with Derek admits his knowledge of John's relation to Kyle; John then sees his uncle as a surrogate father since. In the episode "Goodbye to All That," during one of Derek's recollections of the future war, Kyle (when he was a Corporal) and a small group of his unit attempted to save forty prisoners, including General John Connor, from Skynet's forces. However, he became trapped and one of the Resistance's senior officers, Martin Bedell, sacrifices his life to save him and free Skynet's prisoners. In the episode "The Demon Hand", it is hinted at by Sarah to Derek Reese that Kyle's ashes were scattered "in the grass"; a later episode shows that he was in fact buried in a grave marked only by the year of his death, and in the next-to-last episode of the series, Derek's own ashes are buried next to his brother, or at least in the same cemetery where his brother rests.

A mental image of Kyle Reese appeared to a wounded Sarah in the episode "The Good Wound". Throughout the episode, her image of Kyle guides her in finding medical treatment for herself along with getting help from Derek Reese, Kyle's brother. In the season two finale "Born to Run", John is led by Catherine Weaver to an alternate post-Judgment Day timeline where John Connor has never led the Resistance due to the displacement from his present. There, he encounters his father for the first time.

== Video games ==
A teenage Kyle Reese, voiced by actor Billy O'Sullivan, appears in a video game The Terminator: Skynet (1996), developed by Bethesda Softworks, set before the events of the first film.

Kyle, voiced by Julio Cesar Cedillo, appears in another video game The Terminator: Dawn of Fate (2002), developed by Paradigm Entertainment, set also before the events of the first film.

An older Kyle appears in a mobile MMO strategy video game, Terminator Genisys: Future War (2016), created by Plarium. The events of the game take place in the alternate, post-apocalyptic future timeline of Terminator Genisys, where he becomes the leader of the resistance movement against Skynet instead of John Connor.

Kyle appears in a first-person shooter video game Terminator: Resistance (2019), created by Teyon. The events of the game take place in the original future war depicted in the films The Terminator and Terminator 2: Judgment Day, featuring multiple possible endings. In the downloadable content (DLC) Annihilation Line, released in December 2021, and set during the middle of the main game's campaign mode, as Jacob Rivers, the player teams up with Kyle Reese to rescue a group of people captured by Skynet.
