= Terminator Genisys =

2015 science-fiction film by Alan Taylor

- Theatrical release poster
- Directed by: Alan Taylor
- Written by: Laeta Kalogridis; Patrick Lussier
- Produced by: David Ellison; Dana Goldberg
- Starring: Arnold Schwarzenegger; Jason Clarke; Emilia Clarke; Jai Courtney; J. K. Simmons; Dayo Okeniyi; Matt Smith; Courtney B. Vance; Michael Gladis; Sandrine Holt; Lee Byung-hun
- Cinematography: Kramer Morgenthau
- Edited by: Roger Barton
- Music by: Lorne Balfe
- Production company: Skydance Productions
- Distributed by: Paramount Pictures
- Release dates: June 22, 2015 (Berlin); July 1, 2015 (United States)
- Running time: 126 minutes
- Country: United States
- Language: English
- Budget: $155–158 million
- Box office: $440.6 million

Terminator Genisys is a 2015 American science fiction action film serving as a reboot and the fifth installment in the Terminator franchise. Directed by Alan Taylor from a screenplay by Laeta Kalogridis and Patrick Lussier, the film stars Arnold Schwarzenegger reprising his role as the Terminator, alongside Jason Clarke, Emilia Clarke, Jai Courtney, J. K. Simmons, and Lee Byung-hun. Despite Schwarzenegger's involvement and the mirroring of certain events from the previous films, the film is a standalone entry with no canonical connection to the prior installments; it is described as a "reimagining" of The Terminator (1984) and Terminator 2: Judgment Day (1991).

The plot follows Kyle Reese (Courtney), a soldier from a post-apocalyptic 2029 where humanity wages war against Skynet. Sent back to 1984 to protect Sarah Connor (Emilia Clarke), Reese discovers the timeline has been altered—Sarah was raised by a reprogrammed Terminator (Schwarzenegger) sent to guard her. The film explores the consequences of Skynet's interference with temporal events.

Development began after the Halcyon Company, then-owners of the franchise, filed for bankruptcy following the underperformance of Terminator Salvation (2009). Megan Ellison's Annapurna Pictures acquired the rights in 2011, partnering with her brother David's Skydance Productions. However, Annapurna dropped their involvement, although Megan still retained executive producer credit. The producers consulted original creator James Cameron and drew inspiration from the first two Terminator films. Principal photography occurred mainly in New Orleans and San Francisco, with visual effects handled by six companies and practical effects by Legacy Effects.

Premiering at the Dolby Theatre on June 28, 2015, and released widely on July 1 by Paramount Pictures, the film was largely panned by critics for its plot, though some praised the action sequences and Schwarzenegger's return. It grossed $440.6 million worldwide, making it the franchise's second-highest-grossing entry after Terminator 2, yet it underperformed relative to expectations. Planned sequels and a TV spin-off were cancelled, though a video game, Terminator Genisys: Future War, was released in 2017. The franchise continued with Terminator: Dark Fate (2019), a direct sequel to Terminator 2.

== Plot ==
In 2029, Human Resistance leader John Connor launches a final offensive against Skynet, an artificial general intelligence system seeking to eliminate the human race. Before the Resistance can triumph, Skynet activates time displacement equipment and sends a T-800/Model 101 Terminator back to 1984 to kill John's mother Sarah. John's right-hand man, Kyle Reese, volunteers to travel back in time to protect her. While floating in the equipment's magnetic field, Kyle sees John being attacked by another Resistance soldier. This creates a temporal paradox that alters the timeline and causes Kyle to experience childhood memories from a parallel version of himself.

However, when it arrives in 1984 Los Angeles, Skynet's T-800 is attacked by "Pops", a reprogrammed T-800. The two fight until Sarah arrives and shoots the Skynet-controlled T-800 with an anti-tank rifle, which crashes its system. An unknown party had sent Pops to 1973 to protect Sarah when she was nine years old, after her parents were killed by a T-1000 sent by Skynet. After arriving in 1984, Kyle steals a homeless man's pants, but is soon intercepted by the T-1000. Eventually, the T-1000 corners him, but Sarah and Pops rescue him. The three run to the sewers, pursued by the T-1000, but Sarah and Pops melt it with an acid trap.

Sarah and Pops have constructed makeshift time displacement equipment like Skynet's, and Sarah plans to stop Skynet by traveling to 1997, the year it becomes self-aware. However, realizing that the past has been altered, Kyle is convinced that the future has also changed. He recalls a warning he received in his childhood vision, convincing Sarah that they instead must travel to 2017 to stop Skynet. After fighting the T-1000, Pops has sustained exterior damage that prevents him from time traveling. He stays in 1984 and plans to meet up with Kyle and Sarah in the future, preparing for their arrival in the meantime.

In 2017, Kyle and Sarah materialize in the middle of a busy San Francisco highway and are apprehended by city police. While being treated for injuries, Sarah and Kyle learn that Skynet is called "Genisys"—a soon-to-be-unveiled global operating system which is embraced by the public. John then appears and rescues Sarah and Kyle. Pops arrives and shoots John, revealing that John is now an advanced Terminator. (Note: Identified offscreen as a T-3000.) The resistance soldier who attacked John is revealed to have been Skynet in physical disguise as a T-5000 Terminator named Alex. (Note: Skynet is credited as "Alex" and identified offscreen as being a T-5000 Terminator.) While Kyle was traveling back in time, Alex attacked John and infected him with nanomachines that converted him into a cyborg on a cellular level. John, brainwashed to ensure Skynet's creation, traveled back in time to assist Cyberdyne Systems with the development of Genisys, hence securing Skynet and its machines' rise. Pops fights John before trapping him long enough for them to escape.

A day before Skynet's worldwide attack, Sarah, Kyle, and Pops retreat to a safe house and make final preparations to destroy Cyberdyne's Genisys mainframe. They head toward Cyberdyne's headquarters with John in close pursuit. During an airborne chase, Pops dives-bombs into John's helicopter and causes it to crash. John survives the crash and enters the Cyberdyne complex, where it advances the countdown from 13 hours to 15 minutes due to Skynet's aging. Kyle, Sarah, and Pops plant bombs at key points in the facility while holding off John.

In a final battle, Pops traps John in the magnetic field of a prototype time machine. Both are destroyed, but just before the explosion, Pops' remains are flung out of the apparatus into a nearby vat of experimental mimetic polyalloy. Kyle and Sarah reach a bunker beneath the facility, and the explosion sets off the bombs, preventing Genisys from coming online. Pops appears, upgraded with mimetic polyalloy components like those of the T-1000, and helps them escape from the debris.

The trio travels to Kyle's childhood home, where Kyle tells his younger self about Genisys and instructs him to repeat the warning to himself, securing the trio's arrival from 1984. Sarah, Kyle, and Pops drive off into the countryside.

A mid-credits scene reveals that the system core of Genisys, located in a protected subterranean chamber, has survived the explosion. (Note: While initially intended as a teaser for two planned film sequels and a spin-off television series to the film, the post-credits scene of Terminator Genisys ultimately served as a teaser for a video game direct sequel to the film, Terminator Genisys: Future War, released on May 18, 2017.)

== Cast ==
- Arnold Schwarzenegger as the Terminator / Pops:
  A reprogrammed T-800 Terminator who is Sarah's protector and mentor.
  - Brett Azar stood in on-set as the body double for the T-800 Terminator (of the first film who time-traveled to 1984) and the Young Guardian in 1973.
- Jason Clarke as John Connor:
  The leader of the Resistance and Kyle's mentor, who was attacked by T-5000 and turned into a T-3000 Terminator composed of machine phase matter.
- Emilia Clarke as Sarah Connor:
  Pops' protégée and destined to be John's mother.
  - Willa Taylor as Young Sarah
- Jai Courtney as Kyle Reese:
  A Resistance soldier and John's protégé destined to be John's father.
  - Bryant Prince as Young Kyle
- J. K. Simmons as O'Brien:
  An alcoholic police detective from the San Francisco Police Department (SFPD) and former Marine who investigates time travelers, particularly Terminators.
  - Wayne Bastrup as Young O'Brien:
    An LAPD beat cop in 1984 who witnesses the encounter between Kyle and the T-800.
- Dayo Okeniyi as Danny Dyson:
  Miles's son and Cyberdyne Systems' president; he co-creates the operating system Genisys with John Connor.
- Matt Smith (credited as Matthew Smith) as Alex:
  An advanced T-5000 Terminator who embodies Skynet. Alex's appearance is also used by Skynet as a holographic avatar in 2017.
  - Ian Etheridge as Skynet, age 10.
  - Nolan Gross as Skynet, age 12–14.
  - Seth Meriwether as Skynet, age 18.
- Courtney B. Vance as Miles Dyson:
  Cyberdyne Systems' CEO who funds the Genisys project.
- Michael Gladis as Lieutenant Matias:
  A SFPD police lieutenant and O'Brien's superior.
- Sandrine Holt as Detective Cheung:
  A SFPD police detective.
- Byung-Hun Lee as Cop / T-1000:
  A shapeshifting prototypical Terminator composed of mimetic polyalloy.

== Production ==
=== Development ===
Although Terminator Salvation was intended to begin a new trilogy, the production of a fifth film was put on hold because of legal issues with franchise owner the Halcyon Company (which filed for Chapter 11 bankruptcy in August 2009). To avoid bankruptcy, Halcyon later decided to sell the rights to the franchise and valued the property at $70 million. On February 8, 2010, the franchise was auctioned for $29.5 million to Pacificor, a hedge fund which was the largest creditor in Halcyon's bankruptcy proceedings. The deal erased Halcyon's debts to Pacificor and guaranteed Halcyon $5 million for each additional Terminator sequel produced, to pay other outstanding debts. Pacificor sold the franchise again in May 2010.

In August of that year, Hannover House announced plans to develop a 3D animated film titled Terminator 3000. Pacificor responded with a cease and desist letter, declining a $20–30 million offer from Hannover for the rights to produce the film. In February 2011, Universal Studios considered investing in a fifth Terminator film with Arnold Schwarzenegger returning to the title role, Fast & Furious director Justin Lin at the helm and Chris Morgan as the screenwriter. In late April 2011, a proposed Terminator package, dropping Morgan and adding producer Robert W. Cort, was presented to Universal Studios, Sony, Lionsgate and CBS Films. Metro-Goldwyn-Mayer (MGM) had a 30-day right of first refusal to finance and distribute Terminator 5 since 2006.

It was eventually picked up by Megan Ellison and her production company, Annapurna Pictures, in May 2011 after they purchased at auction the rights to make at least two more Terminator films. The deal was finalized on December 4, 2012; the final price was reportedly less than the auction pledge because new copyright laws had raised concerns that the rights would revert to Terminator creator James Cameron in 2019. Ellison's brother David and others from his Skydance Productions agreed to co-produce the film. After acquiring the rights to the franchise, Megan Ellison asked Cameron for input on the new film. Cameron met several times with David Ellison, where they discussed Schwarzenegger's role and how to remain true to the T-800 character. Director Justin Lin had to leave the project because of his involvement in Fast & Furious 6. Two screenwriters, Laeta Kalogridis and Patrick Lussier, were commissioned to write the screenplay in January 2013. Kalogridis and Lussier turned down the project three times, but Cameron persuaded them to accept it.

Paramount Pictures (which has a financing and distribution deal with Skydance) was confirmed as the distributor in June 2013, when they and the producers announced a release date of June 26, 2015. Rian Johnson, Denis Villeneuve and Ang Lee were approached to take over direction from Lin, but Thor: The Dark World director Alan Taylor was selected in September 2013. Storyboard artist Jane Wu, Taylor's girlfriend, urged him to turn down the offer after reading the script, insisting that he should direct something more personal and that he loved, but Taylor was persuaded and tempted with the prospect of working with Schwarzenegger, who impressed him during their meetings, and with the chance to build on the legacy of Cameron's franchise. Taylor felt that he should direct the film due to his love for the first two Terminator films, believing that he could "fix" the script and make the film work. In January 2014, Megan Ellison announced that Annapurna was no longer financing the film; Skydance and Paramount would provide funding while Ellison would be credited as an executive producer.

=== Casting ===
On June 13, 2013, Schwarzenegger said that he would return for his fourth film as the Terminator. By early November, Garrett Hedlund was under consideration for the role of Kyle Reese and Taylor wanted Tom Hardy to portray John Connor. That month the choice for Sarah Connor was narrowed to Emilia Clarke, Tatiana Maslany and Brie Larson, and Clarke was selected in December. Paramount had wanted Larson for the role, but Taylor preferred Emilia Clarke. In December 2013, Jason Clarke, who is not related to Emilia, was in negotiations to play John Connor. Jason Clarke was David Ellison's first choice for the role. He was impressed by Clarke's performance in Megan Ellison's film Zero Dark Thirty (2012). In February 2014, the studio considered Jai Courtney and Boyd Holbrook as Reese, and later that month Courtney was confirmed for the role. J. K. Simmons began talks for the role of Detective O'Brien in March. According to late-March announcements, Dayo Okeniyi would play Danny Dyson and Lee Byung-hun, Michael Gladis and Sandrine Holt joined the cast (Lee in a key role). Matt Smith was confirmed as a cast member in May, followed by Douglas Smith in June.

=== Writing ===
The film's producers, David Ellison and Dana Goldberg, worked with writers Kalogridis and Lussier to devise the story. Kalogridis and Lussier were invited to write the script while they worked on another project with Ellison and Goldberg. They agreed to write a Terminator film when Cameron, a friend of Kalogridis who worked with her on Avatar, gave it his blessing.

The starting point of the script was to retain Schwarzenegger as a central character, unlike the Star Trek reboot with Leonard Nimoy as an older Spock in a minor role. They had to write in the actor (now 67 years old) and followed a suggestion by Cameron that the Terminator's living-tissue exterior was vulnerable to aging and their idea of Skynet sending a Terminator after an infant Sarah Connor. Kalogridis and Lussier extended this to the core characters of Kyle, Sarah and John Connor, despite each being from a different time period.

Although the writers reportedly enjoyed Terminator 3: Rise of the Machines, they opted to escape its suggestion that Judgment Day is inevitable because of a causal loop in favor of all Terminator timelines existing simultaneously in a multiverse. To map out the timelines and plot, Kalogridis and Lussier had five whiteboards "covering every wall in the office". They eventually reached a central plot thread in which the Skynet of one universe, defeated in several timelines, sent the T-5000 to the Genisys timeline hoping to defeat the humans by "having the best weapon that humans have": John Connor. The first draft of the screenplay, to attract a director, was delivered in July 2013. Few changes were made to the script from that point onward. One expansive scene that was removed from the final script would have explained what Sarah Connor's life was like with Pops.

The film is inspired by the first two Terminator films from Cameron – The Terminator and Terminator 2: Judgment Day – while largely ignoring the two subsequent films that came before Genisys. Concepts from the second movie, such as the T-1000, are featured, but its events are disregarded; the 2029 that is depicted in Genisys is one in which the attack on the Cyberdyne building either had no effect on Skynet's development or did not happen at all, as August 29, 1997 is still the date of Judgment Day in that timeline. David Ellison described the film and its intended film trilogy as standalone projects based on Cameron's original Terminator films. Ellison said the film is neither a sequel or a prequel to previous Terminator films, saying "For us this is Terminator 1, this is not Terminator 5". A Skydance executive said, "It's not a traditional remake, nor is it a continuation or a sequel, nor is it exactly a reboot. In a sense, it's a reimagining".

The film features seven different time periods, with 1984 and 2017 being the primary setting for the story. Taylor said the film's storyline would be more complex in comparison to the original two films because of its time-travel aspect. He also described the original Terminator film as a love story and the second as a father/son story and said that Genisys would be a combination of the two ideas, including a focus on the aspect of a dysfunctional family. David Ellison said the film was inspired by the idea of technological singularity, stating that in reality, humans are addicted to technology "to the point where it's easy to imagine a world where Skynet has infiltrated every single aspect of your life, and you didn't fight it - you invited it in."

=== Filming ===
Principal photography began on April 21, 2014, in New Orleans. The film shot under the code name Vista, a possible reference to the Terminator's "hasta la vista" line in Terminator 2: Judgment Day. The first unit shot the film over a total of 90 days, in high definition. An early sequence from The Terminator is recreated in Terminator Genisys, in which Kyle Reese and a T-800 arrive in 1984 from the future. Because the original film was owned by a different company, the filmmakers did not have the rights to use its opening sequence in Terminator Genisys and instead had to recreate the scenes. In addition, Taylor explained that the original footage would not look right with the rest of the film due to its grain quality. The sequence was shot within the first two weeks of filming. The T-800's arrival in 1984 takes place at Griffith Park in Los Angeles, a location that was recreated as a set in New Orleans.

To authentically recreate one of the scenes, costume designer Susan Matheson had Nike produce new pairs of discontinued Nike Vandal sneakers for Courtney to wear. Matheson had initially searched for a pair of the sneakers, but the ones that she came across did not look new enough for the scene. Matheson eventually spoke to Paramount, which convinced Nike to produce 25 pairs of Vandal sneakers for the film. For certain scenes, the production tried to match the cinematography of the first two Terminator films. Scenes set in 1984 favored blue, green and black tones to match the look of The Terminator and those set during the future war against the machines were modeled after similar scenes in Terminator 2: Judgment Day. For the future soldiers, arm and shoulder pieces were made of rubber car mats which had been cut up and aged to simulate makeshift armor that the soldiers had salvaged. Legacy Effects, successor to Stan Winston Studio, created the Terminator robotic and make-up effects, led by John Rosengrant (who worked on the previous four Terminator films). Jeff Dawn, lead make-up artist for the first three installments, did not return.

To prepare for his role, Jason Clarke observed Edward Furlong's performance as John Connor in Terminator 2: Judgment Day. For a scene in which John Connor delivers a motivational speech to his troops, Jason Clarke referred to passages from Hamlet, Henry V and a Steve Jobs speech. Courtney watched the previous Terminator films for context and inspiration, but did not seek to replicate the performances of actors who portrayed Kyle Reese in those films. Courtney and Emilia Clarke underwent physical training to prepare for their roles. Courtney had to slim down his physique to appear less imposing. Clarke also went through training for scenes involving weapons and stunts and had to change her hair color for the role. Clarke, who is from the UK, adopted an American accent. One scene is shot as a flashback to the 1970s, during which young Sarah Connor is played by Taylor's 11-year-old daughter, Willa Taylor.

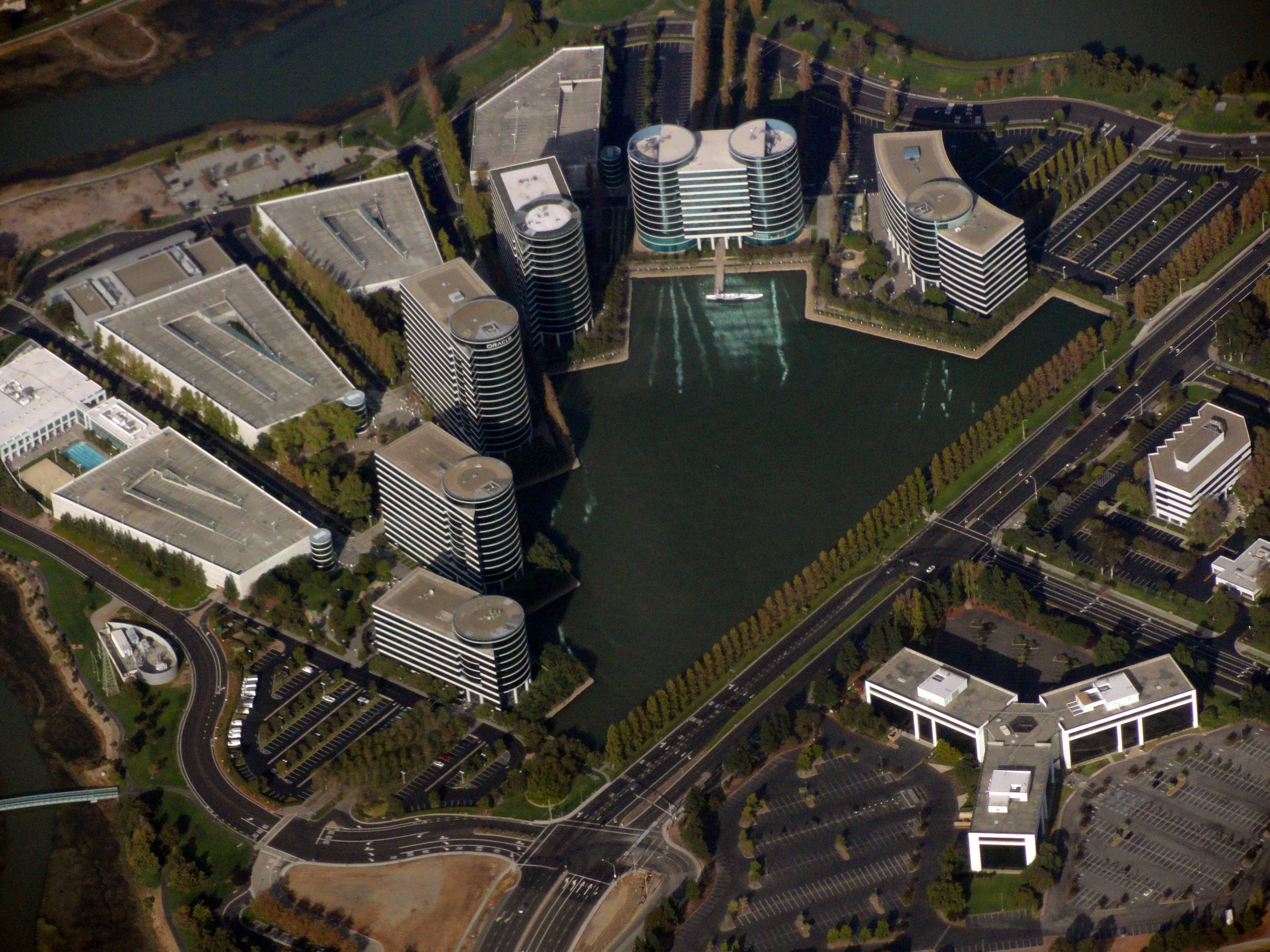
Oracle Corporation headquarters

Filming in New Orleans included NASA'S Michoud Assembly Facility, where a set was constructed to portray part of the Cyberdyne facility's interior, as well as its time machine. Michoud was the only location in Louisiana tall enough to contain the set. Filming took place there during July 2014. The Oracle Corporation headquarters in Redwood City served as the exterior of Cyberdyne; Oracle was founded by the Ellisons' father, Larry. Filming at the Oracle headquarters, including interior scenes, took place at the end of July 2014.

In early August 2014, filming took place at the Bay Bridge and Golden Gate Bridge in San Francisco. Scenes involving cable cars and stunt automobiles were shot on San Francisco's California Street from the night of August 4 to the early hours of August 5, 2014. Because of the late-night filming, the production team had to receive approval from residents and business owners in the area; nearly 99 percent of them approved the shoot. Filming would also take place on Mission Street, in which extras flee from a threat which would be added in later through computer-generated technology. The scenes would depict chaotic city scenes. Subtle action scenes were also scheduled to continue at the Golden Gate Bridge. One scene features a school bus that is flipped through the air while driving on the Golden Gate Bridge. A 500-foot-long replica of the bridge was built in New Orleans for the shot involving the bus flip, something that was done without visual effects. Scroggins Aviation Mockup & Effects was called in to fabricate and build the Police AS350 and Coast Guard A109 helicopter mock-ups for the production.

On August 6, 2014, it was announced that filming had concluded and that the official title would be Terminator Genisys rather than Terminator Genesis. Ellison later said about the film's Genisys title, "It didn't work. The actual thought process behind it was, we were kind of playing on words a la Google. And it's in reference to genesis, which is in reference to the singularity and the man-machine hybrid that John Connor ends up beginning. Also, if you pronounce it a different way it signals a new beginning. So it was kind of a play on words and it did not come across that way." At one point during post-production, the mid-credits scene was included at the end of the film, before the credits. Taylor decided to make it a mid-credits scene after getting reactions from test audiences.

=== Visual effects ===
Visual-effects supervisor Janek Sirrs oversaw approximately 1,200 visual-effects shots generated at Double Negative, Moving Picture Company (MPC), Industrial Light & Magic (ILM), Lola VFX, One of Us and Method Studios. Double Negative was the lead company, with 900 shots which included the T-1000, T-5000 and T-3000 Terminators, the helicopter and bus-chase scenes and the Cyberdyne explosion. The complexity of the T-3000, which had to be shown as a living mass of nanomites with the ability to transform in successive layers, required as much as 20 hours to render a single frame. The mechanical cells aimed to resemble the material on stealth aircraft, with a result described as "more matte than metal" and resembling a slightly-iridescent ceramic carbon. Since the T-3000 was a man transformed into a robot, the design aimed for a human shape streamlined for better combat efficiency. The T-1000 was built from fluid simulations, their environments filmed with high-resolution cameras to ensure proper reflection. Its acid destruction was realistically depicted after studies of acids burning aluminum ingots and other metal. Double Negative's artists shot many reference plates of San Francisco, including scans of the Golden Gate Bridge, to ensure that the city was recreated properly in the bus and helicopter chases.

MPC's most elaborate effect was the digital recreation of the original Terminator, which required 12 months for 35 shots (completed 30 minutes before the final print was submitted to the studio). Performance capture was used only for facial animation, since Schwarzenegger was scanned reading his lines. The studio's artists studied archive footage of the actor, focusing mainly on The Terminator and Pumping Iron and were given a 1984 plaster cast of him. On set, the fight between both Terminators had Schwarzenegger and Brett Azar (a bodybuilder chosen for his resemblance to the actor in 1984) and, in more dangerous scenes, Azar and a stunt double—requiring effects artists to replace the face of Pops. MPC also handled the future battle, with set extensions and Skynet robots and vehicles based on models by Legacy Effects. ILM did the opening scene – in which San Francisco is wiped out on Judgment Day, inspired by the Los Angeles nuclear destruction in Terminator 2: Judgment Day – and the Terminator vision. For the IMAX 3D release, the film was remastered with IMAX DMR technology to create 3D effects and a high-resolution film print.

== Music ==
Christophe Beck was initially hired to score the film, but was replaced by Lorne Balfe. Hans Zimmer joined in as an executive music producer. Balfe aimed to create a soundtrack which stood in its own, since Terminator Genisys is "not a prequel and not a sequel", incorporating Brad Fiedel's iconic theme in The Terminator, as it had "a nod to the past but also bring it into the future." The soundtrack was released by Paramount Music and Skydance Media on June 17, 2015. Chinese pop singer Jane Zhang (in her first English-language recording) and hip hop artist Big Sean (in his musical feature film debut) contributed "Fighting Shadows", released by Def Jam Recordings on June 30, 2015, as a soundtrack bonus track.

== Release ==
=== Marketing and controversy ===
Photos of the cast were shot by Entertainment Weekly and published in October 2014, providing a first look at the film's characters. The photos received various criticisms. On December 2, 2014, Paramount released the film's first motion poster, showing a T-800 disintegrating into dust before the logo appeared. A preview trailer was released the following day, with brief clips from the film accompanied by "I'd Love to Change the World" by Jetta. Differing from past Terminator releases, the preview had forced-looking camera motion in aerial-effect scenes and a first look at the color grading used to evoke the look of past films. The full trailer debuted on December 4. A second trailer (released in April 2015) was noted for spoiling the scene in which John Connor becomes a Terminator, a decision criticized by Alan Taylor and the writers.

At the WWE pay-per-view event WrestleMania 31, the film was promoted with an elaborate entrance stage for wrestler Triple H. On the stage, Triple H donning a Terminator outfit and a video played of Schwarzenegger saying: "Judgment Day is here. It's time to play the game." Several brands were promotional partners.

On June 14, Schwarzenegger visited Marine Corps Base Camp Pendleton for an advance screening of Terminator Genisys. Two days later, Waze added Schwarzenegger's Terminator voice as a voice-navigation option. Schwarzenegger released a video that day of himself walking around Hollywood dressed as the Terminator and posing as a wax model at Madame Tussauds Hollywood. The video promoted a fundraising contest to benefit the After-School All-Stars which would bring selected donors to the Terminator Genisys premiere.

Several YouTubers appeared with Schwarzenegger in a YouTube miniseries, Terminator Genisys: The YouTube Chronicles, produced by Heresy and released on June 22. Consisting of videos uploaded by Machinima, Lilly Singh and Toby Turner (who also plays the T-360, a similar model of the T-1000), the series also included Eliot Dewberry, Ricky Hayberg, Olga Kay, Sean Klitzner, Lloyd Ahlquist and Matthew Santoro. The series was directed by Charles Paek and written by Jay Bushman. On June 24, Schwarzenegger spoke to attendees of an early fan screening of the movie in New York City (announced on Reddit), which was followed by an interview and selfie session.

=== Theatrical ===
Terminator Genisys saw its European premiere in Berlin, on June 21, 2015, and had its North American premiere at the Dolby Theatre in Hollywood one week later, on June 28. The film was first released in ten markets on June 25; the following week, it was released in 35 countries (including the United States) in regular, RealD 3D and IMAX 3D formats. On July 26 the film was playing in 64 countries outside North America, and was released in China on August 23, 2015.

=== Home media ===
The film was released for digital download on October 20, 2015, and was released by Paramount Home Entertainment on DVD, Blu-ray and Blu-ray 3D on November 10. Terminator Genisys debuted as the bestselling Blu-ray and the most-rented film of the week and was second in overall home-video sales to Inside Out. It has grossed over $25.1 million in total domestic video sales, bringing the film's gross to $465.3 million. A 4K UHD Blu-ray release occurred on June 12, 2018.

== Reception ==
=== Box office ===
Terminator Genisys grossed $89.7 million in the United States and Canada and $350.8 million in other territories, for a worldwide total of $440.6 million. Of the Terminator franchise, only Terminator 2: Judgment Day earned more at the box office. Because of its $155 million production budget and an estimated $50–100 million spent on marketing, Bloomberg Business reported that the film would have needed to earn at least $450 million in its theatrical run to break even. In August 2015 Forbes cited Terminator Genisys as the first American film to earn $400 million worldwide without grossing $100 million in North America, earnings comparable to the French film The Intouchables. It was the first Hollywood release to earn $100 million in China and less than that in North America; both were duplicated the following summer by Warcraft.

==== North America ====
The film opened on July 1, 2015, in the United States and Canada (the same day as the comedy-drama Magic Mike XXL) in 3,700 theaters and previewed the previous evening in 2,527 theaters. The two films and the holdovers Jurassic World and Inside Out were each projected to earn $45–55 million during the Independence Day holiday period and $27–30 million over the three-day weekend.

Box-office analysts noted that Terminator Genisys would have to compete with Jurassic World and, to some extent, Ted 2 for male moviegoers. They expected the film to have the upper hand, replacing Jurassic World in IMAX theaters, but good earnings were needed internationally to make up any deficits. It made $2.3 million from the Tuesday-night preview—a record for Paramount Pictures, surpassing the $2.1 million earned by Hercules (2014)—and $8.9 million on its Wednesday opening day. The film earned $42.4 million over the five-day opening stretch, including $27 million from 3,758 theaters over the weekend, placing it third at the box office behind Jurassic World and Inside Out. Scott Mendelson of Forbes suggested several possible explanations for its box-office performance: poor marketing, negative reviews, competition from the family-friendly Jurassic World and Inside Out, the decline of Schwarzenegger's star power and American indifference to another Terminator film.

==== Other territories ====
During the weekend of August 2, 2015, Terminator Genisys was playing in 65 countries (including the US and Canada); the film was released in China on August 23. Comparisons of overseas box-office performance were made with Paramount's Mission: Impossible – Ghost Protocol (2011), Pacific Rim, Lucy and World War Z rather than the preceding Terminator Salvation (2009) and the other Terminator films. The film was released in ten countries before its North American debut beginning on June 25, earning $8.4 million over its opening weekend. During its second weekend it expanded to 46 countries, earning $73.3 million and topping the international box office before being passed by Minions the following weekend. The film led in box-office receipts outside North America for four non-consecutive weekends.

Terminator Genisys had the franchise's biggest opening and Schwarzenegger's best in Singapore ($1.4 million) and Colombia ($1.3 million); both exceeded the opening of Terminator Salvation and that of 28 other countries, including Russia, Korea and Mexico. The film topped the box office in Peru, Vietnam, Turkey and 28 other countries, was Paramount's biggest Argentine opening ($2.3 million), and was the biggest July opening and the fifth-biggest of all time in Russia and the CIS ($12.5 million). In the U.K. and Brazil it opened behind Minions, earning $5.8 million and $3.9 million, respectively and was second in France to Les Profs 2 with $3.8 million. Other notable openings were in South Korea ($11.2 million), Mexico ($6.1 million), Japan ($5.4 million), Australia ($4.4 million), Germany ($3.1 million) and India ($3 million). Its largest markets outside the US and Canada were South Korea ($23.5 million), Russia ($21.8 million), Japan ($19 million) the UK ($16.1 million) and Brazil ($11.1 million). Terminator Genisys earned $2.2 million from Chinese midnight showings (the fourth-largest of all time) and $27.4 million on its opening day, the fourth-biggest opening day of all time for a Hollywood film (behind Furious 7, Avengers: Age of Ultron and Transformers: Age of Extinction). It topped the international box office with a one-day gross from China. The film earned $82.8 million in its eight-day opening week (Sunday to Sunday), $58 million from Monday to Sunday and $23.4 million in its three-day opening weekend (Friday to Sunday). As of September 12, 2015, Terminator Genisys had grossed $112.8 million in China.

=== Critical response ===
Review aggregator Rotten Tomatoes reports an approval rating of 26% based on 276 reviews, with an average rating of 4.70/10. The website's critical consensus reads, "Mired in its muddled mythology, Terminator: Genisys is a lurching retread that lacks the thematic depth, conceptual intelligence, or visual thrills that launched this once-mighty franchise." On Metacritic, which assigns a weighted average to critic reviews, the film has a score of 38 out of 100, based on 41 critics, indicating "generally unfavorable reviews". Audiences polled by CinemaScore gave the film an average grade of "B+" on an A+ to F scale. The Los Angeles Times said critics found the film to be a "messy sequel" that was a "convoluted retread" of past films. According to TheWrap, critics found the time travel storyline to be "convoluted" and that the performances were "unremarkable" aside from Schwarzenegger reprising his role.

Joe Morgenstern of The Wall Street Journal criticized the film, saying that it "plays like the worst of all outcomes". James Rocchi of TheWrap compared it negatively to The Terminator, writing that Genisys "comes back from the past to water down a whole season of summer moviegoing". Michael Phillips of the Chicago Tribune criticized the film's lack of originality, calling it "simply business and dull business at that". Mark Kermode of The Observer described it as "marginally better than Terminator 3: Rise of the Machines or Terminator Salvation but still light years short of either The Terminator or Terminator 2: Judgment Day", considering it "utterly unnecessary (if occasionally entertaining)". He added, "Cameron's original 80s production wrung rip-roaring rewards from a smart script and a small budget, but this bloated, smashy-crashy behemoth lacks the role-reversal wit that turned the action of 1991's T2 into something more than mere spectacle." Alan Jones of Radio Times awarded the film two stars out of five, writing "Confusing time travel, lacklustre spectacle and bland casting earmark this unexceptional reboot of James Cameron's classic cyborg v man franchise for the smartphone generation." He also regarded the "CG action" as "unimaginative".

Michael O'Sullivan of The Washington Post enjoyed the film: "Genisys goes back to what made the franchise work in the first place: not the machine inside the man, but vice versa." Richard Lawson of Vanity Fair also gave a positive review, writing that the film "makes a surprisingly compelling case" for itself.

After seeing a pre-release screening of the film, Cameron voiced his support for Terminator Genisys. Describing it as respectful to the first two films, Cameron said he felt like "the franchise has been reinvigorated". However, in 2017, following the film's performance, Cameron recanted his statement and said that he had only supported the film because of his friendship with Schwarzenegger.

Actress Emilia Clarke expressed relief to discover there would not be any sequels following the film's underwhelming box office performance. In reference to the film's director Alan Taylor, with whom she had worked on Game of Thrones, Clarke said, "He was eaten and chewed up on Terminator. He was not the director I remembered. He didn't have a good time. No one had a good time." In a 2021 interview with The Hollywood Reporter while promoting The Many Saints of Newark, Taylor admitted as having "lost the will to make movies and to live as a director" after his experience directing Genisys and Thor: The Dark World, causing him to enter into a depression. He credited his work on a television pilot based on the novel Roadside Picnic and in the Amazon Video series Electric Dreams for helping him to come out of his depression upon rediscovering the joy of filmmaking by making "a couple really tiny things" slowly, smaller and personal like the films he did as a film student.

The production of the film was seen as so disastrous that a nearby crew filming for Fantastic Four even had jackets made that read "AT LEAST WE’RE NOT ON TERMINATOR."

=== Accolades ===
At the 2015 Teen Choice Awards, Terminator Genisys earned two nominations for Choice Summer Movie and Choice Summer Movie Star: Female (Emilia Clarke). It was also nominated at the Golden Trailer Awards for Best Summer 2015 Blockbuster. At the 42nd Saturn Awards, the film received a nomination for Best Science Fiction Film.

== Other media ==
=== Cancelled sequels and television series ===
In December 2013, The Hollywood Reporter reported that a television series was in the works, which would tie into a new Terminator film trilogy. Sequels to Terminator Genisys were scheduled for release on May 19, 2017, and June 29, 2018, under the tentative titles of Terminator 2 and Terminator 3, but they were ultimately cancelled. The two sequels were to be filmed back to back during nine months of continuous shooting. The storylines for the two sequels were devised by Kalogridis and Lussier. The new trilogy would have explained who sent Pops back to protect Sarah Connor. J. K. Simmons would have had further involvement in the new trilogy, and Dayo Okeniyi would have had a significant role reprising Danny Dyson in the second film, which would have focused on John Connor's life after becoming part machine. Jason Clarke said about the cancelled Genisys sequel:

What I remember was that second one was going to be about John's journey after he was taken by Skynet…like going down to what he became; half machine, half man. That's where the second one was going to start, and that's about all I knew. It's such a bummer we didn't get to do that.

Development stalled in 2015 after Terminator Genisys under-performed at the box office. On October 1, 2015, The Hollywood Reporter confirmed that the sequels and television spin-off were on hold indefinitely, following the film's overall box office performance. According to Skydance COO Dana Goldberg, the company was pressing forward with development, but would further analyze market research before starting production. In January 2016, the planned Terminator 2 was removed from Paramount's release schedule. In April 2016, Emilia Clarke said that she would not return for any sequels.

=== Video game ===
In June 2016, following the cancellation of film sequels and a spin-off television series, a video game titled Terminator Genisys: Future War was revealed to be in development. The game's storyline would take place immediately following the events of Terminator Genisys. Future War was released on May 18, 2017.

=== James Cameron's return ===
Ultimately, the film rights to the Terminator franchise reverted to co-creator James Cameron, who along with David Ellison, produced a new film, Terminator: Dark Fate, a direct sequel to Terminator 2: Judgment Day. It was intended to be the first in a new trilogy of planned Terminator films, though they were later cancelled due to the film's poor box office returns.

Terminator: Dark Fate was directed by Tim Miller, and featured the return of Schwarzenegger and Hamilton. It was released on November 1, 2019 to better critical reception than previous entries, though it was nevertheless a commercial failure.

== See also ==
- De-aging in film
