= I'll be back =

Signature catchphrase by Arnold Schwarzenegger

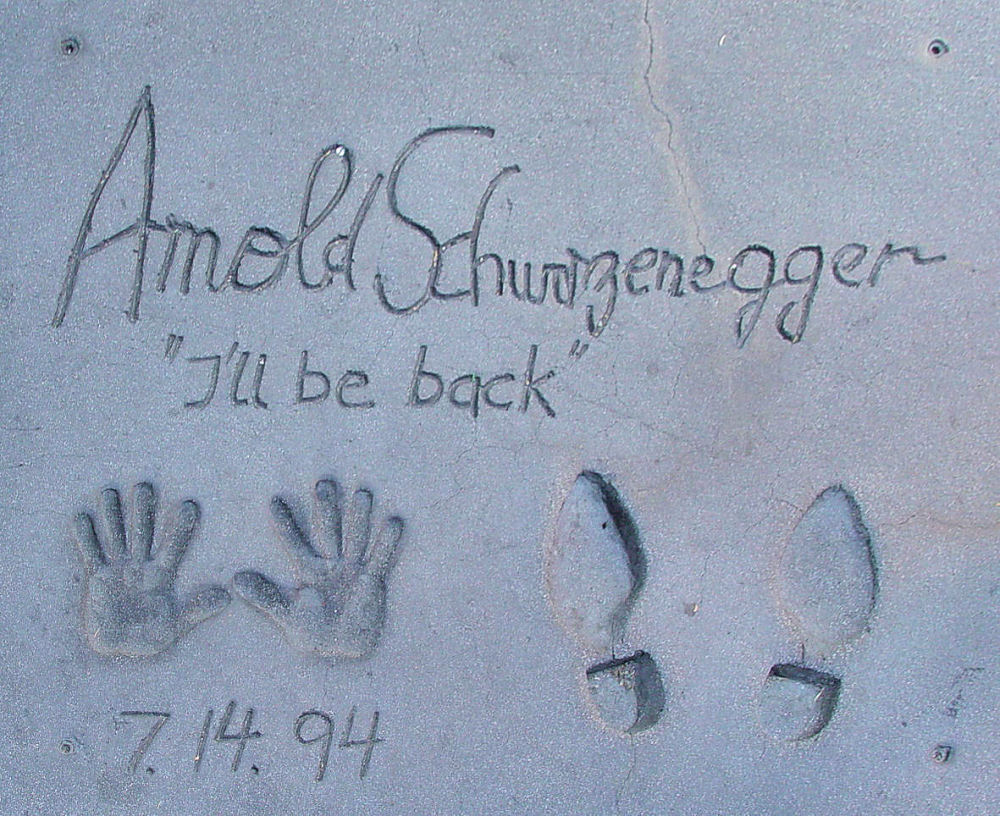
- "I'll be back" in concrete at Arnold Schwarzenegger hand and shoeprints, Grauman's Chinese Theatre
- Character: Terminator
- Actor: Arnold Schwarzenegger
- Written by: James Cameron
- First used in: The Terminator
- Also used in: See variations and in other films
- Voted No. 37 in AFI's 100 Movie Quotes poll

"I'll be back" is a catchphrase associated with Arnold Schwarzenegger. It was made famous in the 1984 science fiction film The Terminator. On June 21, 2005, it was placed at No. 37 on the American Film Institute list AFI's 100 Years... 100 Movie Quotes. Schwarzenegger uses the same line, or some variant of it, in many of his later films.

== History ==
Schwarzenegger first used the line in The Terminator. In the scene, his character, the Terminator, a cyborg assassin, is refused entry to the police station where his targets, Sarah Connor and Kyle Reese, are being detained. He surveys the counter, then tells the police desk sergeant: "I'll be back." Moments later, he drives a car into the station, destroying the counter, and massacres the staff.

In an October 1, 2012, interview on Good Morning America, Schwarzenegger revealed that he had difficulty pronouncing the word I'll and asked director James Cameron if it could be changed to "I will be back". Cameron refused but told him that the shot would be taken as many times as he wished and the best would be used in the final cut of the film so Schwarzenegger could vary the line.

=== Usage in Terminator films ===
Variations of the line have been used by Schwarzenegger and other actors in each of the Terminator films.

- The Terminator (1984) – "I'll be back". Said by the Terminator after being denied entry into a police station. The Terminator returns by driving a car through the front door and massacring the crew of the police station. Schwarzenegger has been quoted that he had not thought much about the line when filming the movie. Cameron notes in the DVD features that he expected the line to get a laugh only upon repeat viewings when what the character means is known, and he was surprised to see it get a big reaction from first-time audiences, who had quickly come to understand the character and immediately anticipated the outrageous violence the nonchalant line signifies. In the novelization of the film script, The Terminator by Shaun Hutson the Terminator says "I'll come back," rather than "I'll be back," on p. 117. ISBN 0-352-31645-4.
- Terminator 2: Judgment Day (1991) – "Stay here, I'll be back." (1:53:47) It is said by the Terminator to Sarah and John Connor during the escape from the Cyberdyne building. The character returns by driving a truck through the front door to rescue the human protagonists trapped inside, referencing the corresponding scene in the first movie. A fitness ad on the initial VHS releases ends with Schwarzenegger telling viewers, "And if you're still not convinced, I'll be back."
- Terminator 3: Rise of the Machines (2003) – "She'll be back" is said by the Terminator in reference to the enemy T-X android. It says "I'm back!" after it flies a helicopter into the antechamber of a military bunker and emerges from the wreckage. In the latter use, the phrase "I'm back" also refers to his return to loyalty and allegiance with the protagonists, after having been "corrupted" by the villainous T-X. Schwarzenegger also uses it in the DVD introduction.
- Terminator Salvation (2009) – "I'll be back" is said by John Connor after being asked by his wife Kate Brewster, "What should I tell your men when they find out you're gone?". Another line, "We knew you'll be back" is said by Skynet in a monitor under the guise of the late Dr. Serena Kogan, after Marcus Wright recovers himself at Skynet Central.
- Terminator Genisys (2015) – "I'll be back" is said by the Guardian right before jumping out of a helicopter onto another pursuing helicopter. Also "I'll go back" is said by Kyle Reese as he volunteers for teleporting back to 1984.
- Terminator: Dark Fate (2019) – "I'll be back" is said by Sarah Connor after she throws a grenade from a bridge at the exoskeleton of the Rev-9 prototype, before marching off with a shotgun, intending on destroying the Terminator. Carl, the T-800 that killed John Connor, tells its human family "I won't be back" before leaving with Sarah, Grace and Dani.

=== Usage in other films ===
Usages before The Terminator:

- Atom Man vs. Superman (1950): Superman says, "I'll be back" repeatedly in episode 8 (at 5 minutes).

Schwarzenegger has uttered the phrase in other films following The Terminator, including:

- Commando (1985): John Matrix (Schwarzenegger) says, "I'll be back, Bennett" in a scene wherein Bennett, Cooke, Sully, and Henriques take him to the airport (at 20 minutes).
- The Running Man (1987): Benjamin Richards (Schwarzenegger) says, "I'll be back!", as he faces off against evil game show host Damon Killian (Richard Dawson), who retorts with "Only in a rerun."
- Twins (1988): Julius Benedict (Schwarzenegger) says, "If you're lying to me, I'll be back" in a scene in the Los Alamos lab, as a doctor reveals that his mother is still alive and he's the result of a genetic experiment.
- Last Action Hero (1993): Jack Slater (Schwarzenegger) says, "I'll be back!" three times.
- The 6th Day (2000): Adam Gibson (Schwarzenegger) says, "I might be back," to a mall sales clerk when deciding whether or not to have his daughter's dog cloned.
- The Expendables 2 (2012): During a gunfight in an airport, Trench (Schwarzenegger) says, "I'm almost out, I'll be back!" To this, Church (Bruce Willis) replies, "You've been back enough. I'll be back." Trench then mutters, "Yippie-ki-yay", which is Willis's famous line in the Die Hard franchise.
- FUBAR (2025): While trying to figure out the password on a nuclear missile set by Luke Brunner (Schwarzenegger), another character suggests "I'll be back." However, he immediately shoots that down.

== See also ==
- "Hasta la vista, baby" – another of Schwarzenegger's catchphrases
- Girlie men, a pejorative term that was notably used by then-Governor of California Schwarzenegger
- "I'll Be Back – The Dancefloor Devastation Kick-Up", a 1991 parody song by Arnee and the Terminaters which reached the UK top 5
- "I shall return" – spoken by Douglas MacArthur as he retreated from the Philippines in World War II
