= Hasta la vista, baby =

Catchphrase

- Character: Terminator
- Actor: Arnold Schwarzenegger
- Written by: James Cameron
- First used in: Terminator 2: Judgment Day
- Voted #76 in AFI's 100 Movie Quotes poll

"Hasta la vista, baby" is a catchphrase associated with Arnold Schwarzenegger's titular character from the 1991 science fiction action film Terminator 2: Judgment Day.

== Origin and use ==
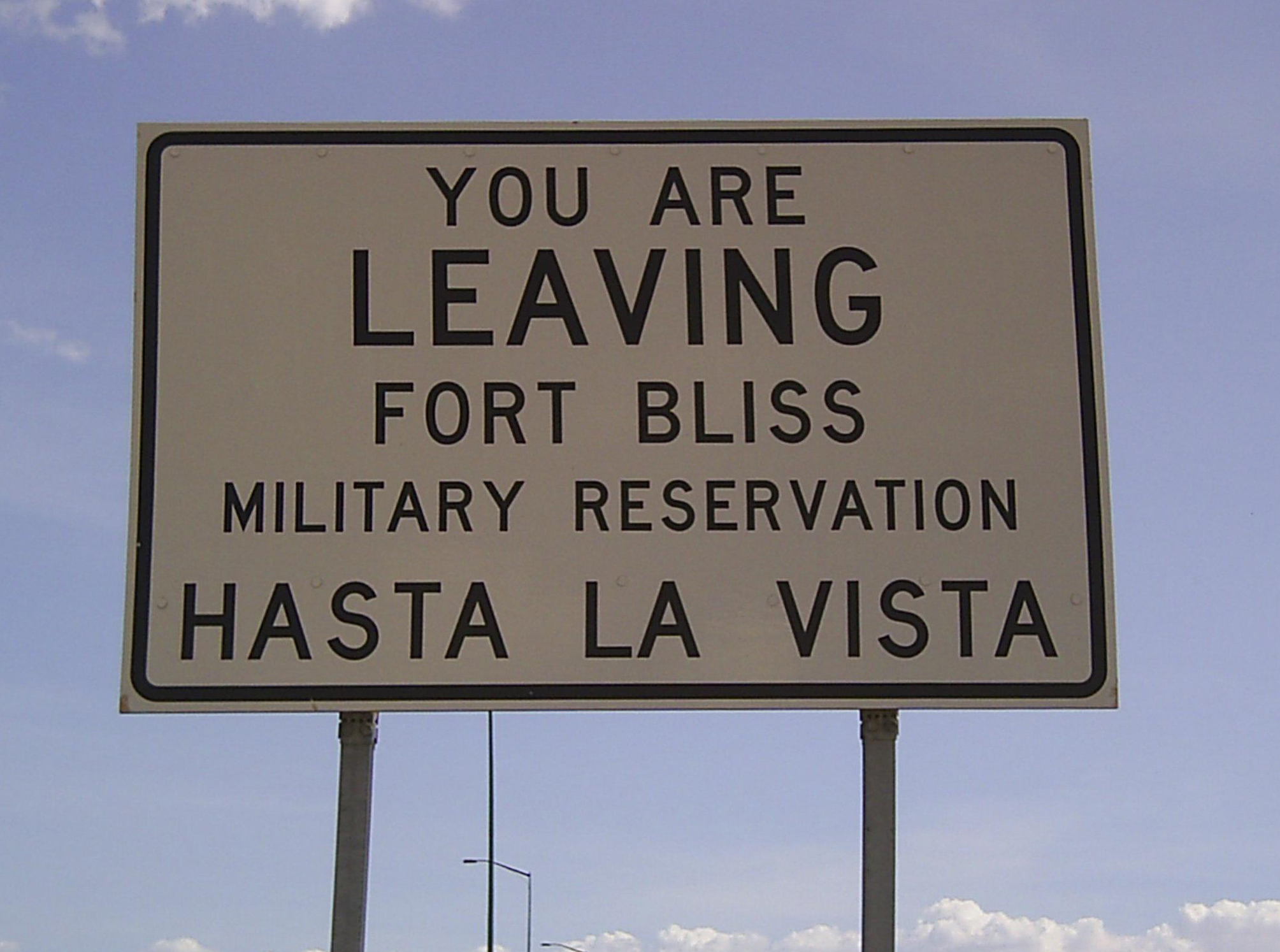
Sign at Fort Bliss U.S. Army post

The term hasta la vista (lit. 'until the view') is a Spanish farewell that can generally be understood as meaning "Until the (next) time we see each other" or "See you later" or "Goodbye". It may have first been popularized in the United States with the comic strip Gordo. In 1970, Bob Hope comically delivered the "Hasta la vista, baby" saying to Raquel Welch in the beginning of their "Rocky Racoon" tribute on Raquel Welch's special Raquel. This term, with the added word "baby"—"Hasta la vista, baby"—was later used in a popular hit song from 1987, "Looking for a New Love" by Grammy Award winner Jody Watley. It was also used in the 1988 Tone Lōc single "Wild Thing".

The phrase became a famous catchphrase when it was used in the 1991 film Terminator 2: Judgment Day. The phrase is featured in an exchange between the film's characters John Connor (Edward Furlong) and The Terminator (Arnold Schwarzenegger), where the former teaches the latter the use of slang:

John Connor: No, no, no, no. You gotta listen to the way people talk. You don't say "affirmative" or some shit like that. You say "no problemo". And if someone comes up to you with an attitude, you say "eat me". And if you want to shine them on, it's "hasta la vista, baby".
T-800: Hasta la vista, baby.

Later in the film, T-800 says the phrase again before shooting the frozen T-1000 with his gun.

In the 2003 film Terminator 3: Rise of the Machines, John Connor (Nick Stahl) utters the phrase again.

Although "hasta la vista" is a Spanish expression, the Castilian Spanish dubbing of the movie replaced the catchphrase with "Sayonara, baby" to reflect the characters' language shift.

== In popular culture ==
The phrase has also been used in the 2003 Canadian film Les invasions barbares and the 2011 French film Case départ.

Boris Johnson, the former prime minister of the United Kingdom, used the phrase to end his last appearance at Prime Minister's Questions in parliament.

This phrase ("Sayonara, baby" in the original Spanish, "Hasta la vista" in the English subtitles and dub) is used in the heist show Money Heist when robber Denver references The Terminator as he is intimidating a hostage.

The phrase is also used as a lyric in the 2023 song "Riptide" by Connor Price and Nic D.

== See also ==
- Hasta la Vista Baby! U2 Live in Mexico City, U2's 1997 live album
- Hasta la Vista, Baby!, a 1998 album from Skin
- "Hasta la vista", Ukraine's 2003 Eurovision entry by Oleksandr Ponomariov
- "Hasta la vista", Belarus's 2008 Eurovision entry by Ruslan Alekhno
- "Hasta la vista", Serbia's 2020 Eurovision entry by Hurricane
- I'll be back – Another Schwarzenegger catchphrase from The Terminator.
