= See Arnold Run =

2005 television film directed by J. B. Rogers

- DVD cover
- Based on: See Arnold Run by Nigel Andrews
- Screenplay by: Matt Dorff
- Directed by: James B. Rogers
- Starring: Jürgen Prochnow; Roland Kickinger; Nora Dunn; Pat Skipper; David Burke; Peter White; Alex Hyde-White; Nicole DeHuff; Mariel Hemingway
- Theme music composer: Lee Holdridge
- Country of origin: United States
- Original language: English

Production
- Producer: Roee Sharon
- Cinematography: Feliks Parnell
- Running time: 90 minutes
- Production companies: Stu Segall Productions; Paramount Home Entertainment

Original release
- Network: A&E Television Networks
- Release: January 30, 2005

See Arnold Run is a 2005 American biographical film starring Jürgen Prochnow and Roland Kickinger, both playing Arnold Schwarzenegger at different ages. The film covers Arnold's early years in bodybuilding and his successful run for Governor of California.

== Cast ==
- Jürgen Prochnow as Arnold Schwarzenegger
  - Roland Kickinger as Arnold Schwarzenegger ('73). Kickinger would later appear in the 2009 film Terminator Salvation as the body double of T-800, with Schwarzenegger's face digitally superimposed over his own.
- Nora Dunn as Arianna Huffington
- Craig Zimmerman as George Butler ('73)
- Mariel Hemingway as Maria Shriver
- Kristen Shaw as Barbara Walters
- Michael Ergas as Franco Columbu
- Nick Stellate as Frank Zane
- David Lloyd Wilson as Gustav Schwarzenegger
- Frank Zane as IFBB Announcer
- Robert Michael Cicherillo as Lou Ferrigno
- Leonard Stone as Warren Buffett

== Reception ==
The film received generally negative reviews, receiving a rating of 24% on Rotten Tomatoes.

SFGate wrote in their review of the film, "Sometimes, in the movie of your life, there's no hero who can save you from your own caricature."
