= Sarah Connor (Terminator) =

Fictional character in the Terminator franchise

- Terminator character
- Linda Hamilton as Sarah Connor in Terminator 2: Judgment Day (1991)
- First appearance: The Terminator (1984)
- Last appearance: Fortnite (2021)
- Created by: James Cameron; Gale Anne Hurd
- Portrayed by: Adult: Linda Hamilton (The Terminator, T2, T2-3D, Dark Fate); Leslie Hamilton Freas (T2 body double); Emilia Clarke (Genisys); Lena Headey (Chronicles); Young: Willa Taylor (Genisys)
- Voiced by: Linda Hamilton (Salvation, Gears 5)

In-universe information
- Full name: Sarah Jeanette Connor
- Gender: Female
- Significant other: Kyle Reese (boyfriend/father of son)
- Children: John Connor (son with Kyle)
- Relatives: Kate Brewster (daughter-in-law, Terminator Salvation); Tara Holden (daughter-in-law, Terminator: Infinity)

Sarah Jeanette Connor is a fictional character and protagonist of the Terminator franchise. She is portrayed by Linda Hamilton in the films The Terminator (1984), Terminator 2: Judgment Day (1991), Terminator Salvation (2009; voice only), and Terminator: Dark Fate (2019), as well as the theme park attraction T2-3D: Battle Across Time (1996). Other actresses to portray the character include Emilia Clarke in the film Terminator Genisys (2015) and Lena Headey in the television series Terminator: The Sarah Connor Chronicles (2008–09).

The character develops from a timid damsel in distress victim in the first film to a wanted fugitive committing acts of terrorism, a hardened warrior and mother who sacrificed everything for her son John Connor's future, on the verge of losing touch with her own humanity, and a mentor preparing and protecting a protégée for her destiny.

In an alternate timeline, depicted in Terminator Genisys, she is in her younger years, raised by a Terminator, while in another alternate timeline, depicted in Terminator: Dark Fate, she hunts numerous rogue Terminators (from various alternate timelines) in the years following her son's death.

== Terminator film series ==
=== The Terminator (1984) ===
Sarah is a Los Angeles college student and waitress who is pursued by a relentless android assassin, the Cyberdyne Systems Model 101 Terminator (Arnold Schwarzenegger). She learns she is in danger from a televised report of two identically named Los Angeles women who were shot to death earlier that day. She is rescued from the Terminator by time-travelling soldier Kyle Reese (Michael Biehn), who says that in the future, an artificial intelligence called Skynet will be created by military software developers to make strategic decisions.

The program will become self-aware, seize control of most of the world's military hardware (including highly advanced robots), and launch an all-out attack on human beings. John Connor will eventually lead the remnants of the world's military and survivors, The Resistance, to victory, only to discover Skynet has invented a means of time travel and sent an android killer back in time to destroy John's mother before he is born. John is Sarah's future son; he sends back a trusted sergeant, Kyle Reese, to protect his mother. During their brief time together, Kyle tells Sarah that she will be responsible for training John in the skills and tactics he will use to fight Skynet.

Kyle protects Sarah from the Terminator and they flee together. Initially, she is unaware that Reese has been in love with her. While they are avoiding the Terminator, Sarah grows to reciprocate his feelings, and they consummate their relationship, resulting in John's conception. Kyle dies fighting the Terminator in a factory. Sarah crushes the Terminator in a hydraulic press. Kyle's sincerity and courage inspire her to develop the skills and abilities that make her a suitable mentor and teacher to John. After these events, Sarah, pregnant and a fugitive, begins making a voice recording to give to John later in life. While recording the tape, a boy takes a photograph that he sells to her; John will give this to Kyle in the future before sending him back in time.

=== Terminator 2: Judgment Day (1991) ===
Sarah and her son John (Edward Furlong) have been separated; John is now ten years old and living in a foster home with Todd and Janelle Voight, and Sarah has been institutionalized at a prison hospital of the criminally insane after trying to destroy a tech research firm. In the years since the previous film, she has become a muscled, ferocious warrior. After the death of Kyle Reese, Sarah takes his warnings and the responsibility of raising her son to heart. Her fixation on the disaster and her fanatical desire to keep John safe has made her mentally unstable and very violent, which is aggravated by her fear and hatred of the Model 101. She lives off-grid to protect herself and John. Sarah lived as an outlaw and tried to teach her son the skills he would need to lead the resistance. She is captured and sent to a psychiatric prison hospital ward (of the criminally insane) after trying to blow up a computer factory. Several times at the hospital, she has tried to improve her behavior in hope of getting to see her son, but the criminal psychologist Dr. Silberman does not believe her. Her activities and claims of fighting evil robots from the future led to her being deemed incurable.

Sarah only seemed to confirm the judgment of psychiatrists by committing acts of violence against hospital staff. She tries to escape multiple times; during her final escape attempt, Sarah encounters two Terminator models; the T-1000 (Robert Patrick), a liquid metal android sent back to kill her son, and the Model 101 (Schwarzenegger) that was sent back by John's future self (Michael Edwards) to protect them. When the Model 101 (or T-800) comes to the hospital ward with John, she flees in terror and is almost captured by the hospital staff, but she goes with the android who tells her "come with me if you want to live." They escape in a police car after knocking the driver unconscious. Sarah finds it nearly impossible to accept that the Model 101 is benevolent; throughout the film she remains hostile towards it. John develops a bond with it, resembling a father-son relationship. In the director's cut of the film, Sarah has an opportunity to destroy the machine's CPU. She nearly does so but John persuades her that they will need its help.

After another horrific nightmare about Judgment Day, Sarah decides to hunt down Miles Dyson (Joe Morton), a computer researcher who works at Cyberdyne Systems and is destined to build the microprocessor that will become Skynet. However, she cannot bring herself to kill a person, realizing that doing so would make her no better than a Terminator herself. Shortly afterwards, John and the Model 101 arrive; with Dyson's help, they destroy all of his research and steal the remains of the first Terminator from the Cyberdyne lab. After the T-1000 is defeated, the Model 101 lets Sarah lower it into a vat of molten steel to destroy it, despite John's protests. Sarah finally gains respect for the Model 101 and offers her hand in friendship before its final sacrifice. Because of this event, Sarah looks to the future with renewed hope.

==== Alternate ending ====
The alternate ending for Terminator 2: Judgment Day, available on the Ultimate Edition DVD and the Skynet Edition Blu-ray, shows Sarah alive and well 30 years after the primary events of the film. She is an elderly grandmother and John is a Senator in a world in which Skynet was never able to start its war on humanity.

=== Terminator 3: Rise of the Machines (2003) ===
Sarah Connor has died from leukemia before the events of the 2003 film. Her son John (Nick Stahl) mentions that they were living in Baja, Mexico when she was diagnosed. Her doctor gave her six months to live but she fought the disease for three years, long enough to see the 1997 "Judgment Day" pass without incident. John hit the road on the day Sarah died, and she was cremated in Mexico where her ashes were spread out to the sea. Never truly believing they had beaten Skynet, her friends stored a cache of weapons in a casket in a niche at a Los Angeles mausoleum for John to find in the event that Judgment Day was not averted and the Terminators returned, in accordance with her will. The T-850 (Schwarzenegger) gathered all the weaponry and had to hide John in the casket from police before reuniting with Kate (Claire Danes).

=== Terminator Salvation (2009) ===
Linda Hamilton reprised her role as Sarah Connor in (voiceovers only) with warning of the future war, in the form of taped recordings for John (Christian Bale) delivered throughout Terminator Salvation.

=== Terminator Genisys (2015) ===
Emilia Clarke as Sarah Connor in Terminator Genisys

Sarah is portrayed by Emilia Clarke. Willa Taylor, the daughter of the film's director Alan Taylor, has a brief role as Sarah's nine-year-old self. The story takes place in an alternate reality to the continuity of the first four films due to Skynet's (Matt Smith) actions throughout the timeline. Consequently, Clarke's portrayal of Sarah represents an alternate timeline variant of the original character played by Hamilton.

In the film, Skynet sends a T-1000 (Lee Byung-hun) to an earlier point in Sarah's life, in 1973, to kill her. Sarah is nine when her parents are killed by it during camping at Big Bear Lake. Sarah is found and raised by a reprogrammed T-800 (Schwarzenegger) sent by an unknown party to be her guardian after her escape. These events result in an altered timeline that erases the events of the earlier films. Clarke's Sarah integrates elements of both Hamilton's portrayal and Furlong's portrayal of John in Terminator 2: Judgment Day; young Sarah teaches the android, which she calls "Pops", how to be more human and forms an emotional bond with the T-800, regarding it as a surrogate father after her parents' deaths.

After the T-1000's attack in 1973, Sarah learns from Pops about her assailant's motive, her destiny as John Connor's (Jason Clarke) future mother, and the Resistance's war against Skynet, including its first attempt to kill her in the original timeline's 1984. Over the next decade, Pops trains Sarah to handle weapons and prepare for her destiny. However, Sarah despises her destiny and wants the ability to choose how to live her life. Because she was trained in combat from childhood, Sarah is not helpless when Kyle Reese (Jai Courtney) arrives to protect her in 1984. In addition, she is headstrong, assertive, and audacious. Unlike her parallel from the original timeline, that being raised by a Terminator, Sarah has extensive knowledge on Skynet, even able to build a makeshift time machine with Pop, having advanced engineering skills decades ahead of her time. She is not dependent upon Kyle, but rather is fighting alongside him. Sarah initially resents her relationship with Kyle being dictated by fate, but she gradually falls in love with him. Having learned of the original timeline's events, Sarah plans to time-travel and destroy Skynet herself rather than conceive John Connor with Kyle Reese like her counterpart, seeking to rewrite the future and satisfy a personal vendetta by dealing a definitive blow to the artificial intelligence that twice disrupted her life.

Discovering the date of Skynet's initial attack has changed from 1997 to 2017, Sarah and Kyle travel 33 years into the future to stop Skynet and their alternate version of John, who had been compromised by Skynet and was changed into a cyborg known as the T-3000. After John's defeat and the prevention of Skynet from spreading to computer servers worldwide, Sarah, Kyle and Pops prepare to face an unknown future, unaware that Skynet is now self-aware in Cyberdyne's underground facility.

=== Terminator: Dark Fate (2019) ===
Hamilton reprises the part of Sarah Connor as the lead character in the 2019 film Terminator: Dark Fate, a direct sequel to Terminator 2 (thus ignoring the events of Terminator 3 and Terminator Salvation). In this timeline, the rise of Skynet is averted, but it dispatched various other Terminators into the past prior to its erasure from history, with the result that John was killed by another T-800 in Guatemala in 1998. Grieving and bitter, Sarah succumbs to alcoholism, and spends the intervening decades hunting down other Terminators based on anonymous texts sent by an unknown figure that direct her to the time and place that they will arrive, allowing her to eliminate them before they can pose a threat. Since the attack on Cyberdyne Systems, Sarah is wanted by the entire United States' authorities.

In 2020, the latest such message eventually leads her to the Rev-9 in Mexico City. Sarah disables the Rev-9 and rescues Daniella "Dani" Ramos as well as her protector, Grace, an augmented soldier and Dani's adopted daughter from the future. Sarah learns that the Rev-9 has been sent by another A.I., Legion, to kill Dani, as she is destined to lead the human resistance against the Legion's machines following the AI takeover, which Sarah and John merely postponed by destroying Cyberdyne Systems' technology. GPS coordinates tattooed onto Grace are revealed to match the source of Sarah's texts, with the group's efforts to track this source revealing that it is the T-800 that killed John. Having completed its primary mission and finding out that Skynet's existence had been erased, it learned from humanity, formed a family and developed a form of conscience, which led it to attempt to make amends with Sarah by sending her the texts so that she could destroy the arriving Terminators and stop their technology being used to rebuild Skynet. This Terminator, now known as Carl, joins them to stop the Rev-9, though Sarah still vows to destroy him after they defeat the Rev-9 for killing John. In a final confrontation in a hydroelectric dam, the Rev-9 is destroyed but Carl and Grace are killed in the process. After Dani vows not to let Grace die again, Sarah vows to prepare her for the coming battle against Legion as she once did with John.

Hamilton was 62 when she reprised her role. Her return marked a rare occurrence of an aged female action hero in cinema, an idea that producer James Cameron was interested in exploring.

== Terminator: The Sarah Connor Chronicles (2008–2009) ==
Sarah Connor
- Terminator: The Sarah Connor Chronicles character
- Lena Headey as Sarah Connor in Terminator: The Sarah Connor Chronicles (2008–2009)
- First appearance: "Pilot" (2008)
- Last appearance: "Born to Run" (2009)
- Based on: Sarah Connor by: James Cameron; Gale Anne Hurd
- Adapted by: Josh Friedman
- Portrayed by: Lena Headey

In-universe information
- Aliases: Sarah Baum; Sarah Reese; Karen; Sarah Gale
- Significant others: Charley Dixon

In the television series Terminator: The Sarah Connor Chronicles, an alternate sequel to the first two films, Lena Headey portrays Sarah Connor. This version of Sarah is an alternate future version of her film series counterpart; her appearances in the first two Terminator films are considered part of this continuity.

=== Production background ===
In November 2005, 20th Century Fox announced that it would produce a television series called Terminator: The Sarah Connor Chronicles featuring the adventures of the title character and her son in the years after Terminator 2: Judgment Day. In November 2006, it announced that Headey had been chosen to play Sarah. The choice of Headey was criticized by several fans and critics, who said she bore no resemblance to the athletic, muscular character portrayed by Hamilton. The controversy was covered by the Los Angeles Times, The Boston Herald, The Guardian, and an online fan group.

Series creator Josh Friedman auditioned over 300 actress for the role; he said he was looking for was someone "who embodied that spirit and who was believable in that role and not just some glammed up, Hollywood, actressy thing".

After a friend recommended Lena Headey for the role, Friedman watched her audition tape and thought she was "a tough, tough woman". Having seen The Terminator when she was a teenager, Headey was aware of the iconic status of the character; she said, "Linda Hamilton will always be the original Sarah Connor and it's a very strong print that she's left, but hopefully people will embrace what I bring to Sarah and see it with fresh eyes". When asked about her approach to the role, Headey said, "I'm playing a mother who is a single parent, bringing up a teenage son, who also happens to save the world—as a byline to her life. And the way I would play that is someone who's passionate and scared and angry and a mother, all these things. So I approach that just trying to be honest within the boundaries of her ..."

=== Season 1 ===
In 1999, four years after the events of the second film (two years in the show's timeline), Sarah and John Connor are living undercover after being blamed for the murder of Miles Dyson and is engaged to paramedic Charley Dixon. Fearing discovery and the certainty of a stable life, they flee again. On his first day in his new school, John is attacked by a T-888 Terminator posing as a substitute teacher called Cromartie. He escapes with the help of Cameron Phillips, a Terminator that resembles a teenage girl, sent back in time by the future John to protect him. Sarah hears of the shooting and rushes to the school but is captured by Cromartie, who uses her to lure John into a trap. Again with the help of Cameron, they flee to a bank where resistance members have hidden the parts of a time machine. As Cromartie attacks them, the trio disappear into the year 2007.

Cameron suggests to Sarah their primary mission should be to stop Skynet, estimated to go online in 2011. Sarah argues against this, but Cameron tells her she would have died from cancer in 2005. The three characters try to evade discovery and find the origins of Skynet. In the third episode of the series, Sarah seeks to avoid getting cancer; she trains her body and takes vitamins and medications.

Sarah's relationship with Cameron has been repeatedly antagonistic and they share a mutual distrust. As Sarah attempts to teach Cameron the value of a human life, Cameron argues the importance of their mission to thwart Skynet's creation even if killing is necessary. During battles with Terminators programmed to kill the Connors, Sarah and Cameron often find themselves working together. Also, since Cameron is the only other person who knows of her cancer situation, Sarah often approaches her for advice in the matter.

In the episode "Queen's Gambit", she discovers that her dead lover Kyle Reese has a brother named Derek, who is also a time-travelling Resistance agent. She hopes to save Derek from being killed by androids. Sarah tells John about his true identity and he seeks help from her former fiancé Charley Dixon to save his uncle's life. Despite her knowledge of his connection to Kyle, Sarah continues to distrust Derek because she is aware that he killed Andrew "Andy" Goode, one of the creators of Skynet. Despite their mutual distrust, there is some attraction between them.

=== Season 2 ===
In the second season, Sarah worries about contracting and dying of cancer. She meets John's new friend Riley Dawson, and is concerned their friendship risks the family's safety from Skynet and Riley's safety. Sarah and Derek help Charley rescue his wife from Cromartie, but she dies in a bomb explosion. Sarah shelters a young boy named Marty Bedell who is being hunted by a T-888 because he shares his name with a future high-ranking member of the human resistance. An attack from Margos Sarkissian leaves John traumatized. Sarah takes the blame of Sarkissian's death for John, which Derek and Cameron later discover when John and Sarah argue. their relationship changes; John cannot let go of his guilt for killing Sarkissian; Sarah realizes that she cannot always protect her son. She seeks counseling from family psychiatrist Boyd Sherman but discovers his role in Skynet's future.

Sarah is kidnapped by Cromartie, but she is rescued by John and James Ellison, an FBI agent who was earlier determined to bring her to justice. Along with Derek and Cameron, they plan to lure Cromartie into a nearby church; they kill and bury it and plan to destroy it later. Sarah smashes its CPU; her stress after the battle results in nightmares and sleepwalking. She visits Dr. Sherman again but is unable to be honest with him. Sarah remembers seeing a three-dotted symbol in her dreams. She has seen this before; it was left by a dying Resistance soldier in her basement. Her obsession with the symbol leads her to Dakara Systems, a technology company whose logo includes it. There, Alexander Agagi II is developing an artificial intelligence program named "Emma". Realizing she has been chasing the wrong lead, Sarah's stress becomes uncontrollable and she smashes mirrors in her bathroom. Derek thinks Sarah is losing her sanity.

At a UFO convention, which Sarah attends to investigate the three-dotted sign, she meets a woman named Eileen, who is really Alan Park, a scientist who specialized in Light Detection and Ranging. Fearing for his life he underwent sex reassignment surgery. He thinks he is being targeted by his former employer, and that drone sightings in the Mojave Desert are a government conspiracy. Sarah takes him to a hypnotherapist named Dr. Barbara Morris, to unravel his memories to reveal the location of the facility. An assassin arrives during the session and murders Morris and Park. Sarah has recorded the session; Park's clues lead her to a warehouse. As she entered the building, she fights and apparently kills a man named Ed Winston, who has wounded her leg. Inside the warehouse, she sees three bright dots in the sky; they are hauls of a Hunter-Killer craft from the future. She kidnaps and forces a doctor to remove the bullet from her leg, and then tells Derek to destroy the evidence of her hospitalization to prevent the authorities and the machines from learning her identity and tracking her. After Derek finds her, Sarah decides to tell him about his relation to John, but he already knows. The family arrives at a company town, Charm Acres, looking for survivors of the warehouse explosion. At the end of their search, Sarah, John, Derek and Cameron see the Hunter-Killer drone.

Ed Winston has survived being shot by Sarah. Following a lead from Charm Acres, Sarah visits the factory where Winston kidnapped her and subjected her to hallucinogenic drugs to find out why she bombed the factory and the identities of her accomplices. After enduring Winston's physical and psychological torments, Sarah breaks free and attacks and shoots him in the head, killing him. She is arrested by the police, beaten up and taken to jail.

Sarah is rescued from jail by John and Cameron; she accompanies them to go see the T-1001 impersonating Catherine Weaver, where it is suggested that she is building something like Skynet, hoping to defeat it. Before Sarah can find out more, the prototype Hunter-Killer assaults the building and the group escape. In the building's basement Cameron gives her A.I. chip to Weaver's creation, which is now stored in the exhumed body of Cromartie, who takes it into the future. John finds Cameron's empty shell lying in the basement and a repeating message on the computer monitors reading, "I'm sorry, John". John discovers he cannot let her go. In an attempt to save both Cameron and Weaver's creation, both John and Catherine go to the future after the Cromartie shell, while Sarah remains in the present to continue the fight.

== Other appearances ==
=== Theme park attraction ===
Linda Hamilton briefly reprised her role for T2-3D: Battle Across Time, a 1996 theme park attraction for Universal Studios. In the attraction, set after the events of the second film, Sarah and John break into Cyberdyne Systems to prevent the creation of Skynet, but they are stopped by a T-1000. John and a T-800 later travel to the future, where they succeed in destroying Skynet, and John returns to the present to reunite with Sarah.

=== Literature ===
The T2 novel trilogy explores Sarah and John's life while living off the grid. The first novel T2: Infiltrator, set six years after the events of Terminator 2: Judgment Day, sees Sarah and 16-year-old John live a relatively normal life under the assumed names John and Suzanne Krieger near a small town in Paraguay, believing they have destroyed Cyberdyne Systems for good and prevented the creation of Skynet. They own a successful trucking company known as Krieger Trucking, while also being proficient smugglers. Sarah works at the company, while John attends military school, quickly becoming one of their best students, gaining military skills, weaponry and hacking knowledge. They gain a new neighbor in Dieter von Rossbach, a former Austrian counterterrorism operative and future model for the T-800 series. He is drawn to the Connors, and after Sarah tells him about the future war, they are attacked by a new T-800, created in the present by a new Terminator model, the i-950 Infiltrator Serena Burns. Realizing that Judgment Day was not permanently averted, they attempt once again to stop Skynet's creation with the help of Dieter. They eventually run into FBI agent Jordan Dyson, Miles Dyson's brother who is looking to capture the Connors for his brother's death and Cyberdyne's destruction, but witnesses the Terminators himself and comes to believe them and decides to help them destroy Cyberdyne's most recent facility and the remaining Terminators. Sarah is fatally wounded by Serena as she destroys her, while Dyson looks after her and makes sure she makes a full recovery. John and Dieter flee to Paraguay once again. Dyson, however, finds out that Cyberdyne has a back-up facility located in Montana and immediately informs them of this information.

The following novel, T2: Rising Storm, shows John and Dieter starting up the foundations of the future Resistance a few months after the events of the previous novel. John traces possible recruits all over the internet, while Dieter secures weaponry and supplies to live through the coming Judgment Day. Dieter has been chosen as John's guardian by Sarah while she recovers from her wounds, becoming Sarah's most trusted asset. She is taken back to Pescadero State Hospital and is transferred to a halfway house by Dr. Silberman. After having seen the T-800 and the T-1000 himself seven years previously, Silberman has come to believe Sarah's story. When an undercover Terminator is watching over the recovering Sarah, Silberman helps her flee across the border so she can make it back to Paraguay, making amends for his previous treatment of her. Sarah stays at Dieter's house, while Dieter and John head to Cyberdyne's back-up site in Montana alongside Wendy Dorset, John's new girlfriend and the Resistance's first recruit. They come to the conclusion that no matter how far Skynet's creation is delayed, it will seemingly always become sentient. John and Wendy design an A.I. virus which prevents it from ever becoming sentient. While Wendy is subdued by Serena Burns' first i-950 clone, Clea Bennet, John mistakenly uploads the wrong program into Skynet's programming and Wendy is killed. A distraught John destroys Clea Bennet alongside Dieter, who end up fleeing the military base. As they head back to Paraguay, John feels like the entire journey was in vain, with he himself being responsible for Skynet's eventual sentience. Meanwhile, Sarah has been attacked by Serena's second clone, Alissa, managing to destroy it and preventing it from succeeding in its mission. Skynet, however, becomes sentient and starts its process of eradicating humanity.

The final novel, T2: The Future War, shows the destruction Skynet causes around the world and its killing of 3 billion lives. Skynet creates machines to track and kill the remaining humans. John has become the leader of the Resistance, with Sarah and Dieter having fallen in love and married. The life between the parents of John's eventual father Kyle Reese is explored, starting with John identifying Kyle's father and debating the extent of influence he should take in his grandfather's life. Eventually, Kyle is born, captured by a patrol unit as a child and forced to work in a Skynet work camp. The work camp is liberated by John and his Tech-Com unit, freeing Kyle and the other prisoners, while Kyle's parents are killed. John assigns his friend Jack Brock to protect Kyle, as well as becoming his foster father. He grows up fighting alongside John and his Tech-Com unit. Around the time John rescues Kyle, he has Sarah fake her death to serve as a martyr to the cause, also acknowledging how Kyle never met Sarah before he was sent back to the past. In 2029, as the Resistance is about to destroy Skynet's defence grid, as a last ditch effort in winning the war it sends back a T-800 to 1984 to kill Sarah Connor, a T-1000 to 1995 to kill a 10-year-old John Connor, and the i-950 unit Serena Burns to 2001 to kill the Connors and ensure Skynet's creation. Once John finds out about this, he sends the volunteering Kyle back to protect Sarah from the T-800 and a reprogrammed T-800 to protect his younger self from the T-1000. Afterwards, Skynet is effectively destroyed and John is greeted by Sarah, Dieter and the remaining Resistance members as they are relieved that the great ordeal is finally over.

Sarah Connor appeared in the non-canonical Superman crossover Superman vs. The Terminator: Death to the Future (2000). In the story, Sarah and John Connor join forces with Superman to destroy Skynet and Superman's robotic enemy Cyborg Superman. In the past, John and Sarah receive assistance from Supergirl (Matrix), Superboy, and Superman's nemesis Lex Luthor. After Superman is drawn into the future by the resistance when they attempted to retrieve a Terminator sent back after John, Skynet is destroyed when Superman detonates an EMP in Earth's atmosphere, using a shielded time machine to return to the past.

=== Video games ===
Sarah Connor appears in the 2019 video game Gears 5, with Hamilton reprising the role. In 2021, Sarah Connor became a playable character in the online game Fortnite.

== See also ==
- List of female action heroes and villains
