= T2 (novel series) =

Series of science fiction novels by S. M. Stirling

- Infiltrator (2001); Rising Storm (2003); The Future War (2004)
- Author: S. M. Stirling
- Country: United States
- Language: English
- Genre: Science fiction
- Publisher: HarperEntertainment; Gollancz S.F.
- Published: 2001–2004
- Media type: Print (hardback & paperback)
- Preceded by: Terminator 2: Judgment Day

The T2 trilogy is a series of novels written by S. M. Stirling, set after the events of Terminator 2: Judgment Day, and first published in May 2001, which makes them the first works to officially continue the franchise. The series consists of three novels: T2: Infiltrator (2001), T2: Rising Storm (2003), and T2: The Future War (2004).

== Plot overview ==
=== T2: Infiltrator (2001) ===
T2: Infiltrator explores Sarah and John's life while living off the grid. Set six years after the events of Terminator 2: Judgment Day, Sarah Connor and her son, 16-year-old John, live a relatively normal life under the assumed names John and Suzanne Krieger near a small town in Paraguay, believing they have destroyed Cyberdyne Systems for good and prevented the creation of Skynet. They own a successful trucking company known as Krieger Trucking, while also being proficient smugglers. Sarah works at the company, while John attends military school, quickly becoming one of their best students, gaining military skills, weaponry and hacking knowledge. They gain a new neighbor in Dieter von Rossbach, a former Austrian counterterrorism operative and future model for the T-800 series. He is drawn to the Connors, and after Sarah tells him about the future war, they are attacked by a new T-800, created in the present by a new Terminator model, the i-950 Infiltrator Serena Burns. Realizing that Judgment Day was not permanently averted, they attempt once again to stop Skynet's creation with the help of Dieter. They eventually run into FBI agent Jordan Dyson, Miles Dyson's brother who is looking to capture the Connors for his brother's death and Cyberdyne's destruction, but witnesses the Terminators himself and comes to believe them and decides to help them destroy Cyberdyne's most recent facility and the remaining Terminators. Sarah is seriously wounded by Serena as she destroys her, while Dyson looks after her and makes sure she makes a full recovery. John and Dieter flee to Paraguay once again. Dyson, however, finds out that Cyberdyne has a back-up facility located in Montana and immediately informs them of this information.

=== T2: Rising Storm (2003) ===
Set a few months after the events of the previous novel, T2: Rising Storm shows John and Dieter starting up the foundations of the future Resistance. John traces possible recruits all over the internet, while Dieter secures weaponry and supplies to live through the coming Judgment Day. Dieter has been chosen as John's guardian by Sarah while she recovers from her wounds, becoming Sarah's most trusted asset. She is taken back to Pescadero State Hospital and is transferred to a halfway house by Dr. Silberman. After having seen the T-800 and the T-1000 himself seven years previously, Silberman has come to believe Sarah's story. When an undercover Terminator is watching over the recovering Sarah, Silberman helps her flee across the border so she can make it back to Paraguay, making amends for his previous treatment of her. Sarah stays at Dieter's house, while Dieter and John head to Cyberdyne's back-up site in Montana alongside Wendy Dorset, John's new girlfriend and the Resistance's first recruit. They come to the conclusion that no matter how far Skynet's creation is delayed, it will seemingly always become sentient. John and Wendy design an A.I. virus which prevents it from ever becoming sentient. While Wendy is subdued by Serena Burns' first i-950 clone, Clea Bennet, John mistakenly uploads the wrong program into Skynet's programming and Wendy is killed. A distraught John destroys Clea Bennet alongside Dieter, who end up fleeing the military base. As they head back to Paraguay, John feels like the entire journey was in vain, with he himself being responsible for Skynet's eventual sentience. Meanwhile, Sarah has been attacked by Serena's second clone, Alissa, managing to destroy it and preventing it from succeeding in its mission. Skynet, however, becomes sentient and starts its process of eradicating humanity.

=== T2: The Future War (2004) ===
T2: The Future War shows the destruction Skynet causes around the world and its killing of three billion people. Skynet creates machines to track and kill the remaining humans. John has become the leader of the Resistance, with Sarah and Dieter having fallen in love and married. The life between the parents of John's eventual father Kyle Reese is explored, with Kyle being born, being captured by a patrol unit as a child and forced to work in a Skynet work camp. The work camp is liberated by John and his Tech-Com unit, freeing Kyle and the other prisoners, while Kyle's parents are killed. John assigns his friend Jack Brock to protect Kyle, as well as becoming his foster father. He grows up fighting alongside John and his Tech-Com unit. In 2029, as the Resistance is about to destroy Skynet's defence grid, as a last ditch effort in winning the war it sends back a T-800 to 1984 to kill Sarah Connor, a T-1000 to 1995 to kill a 10-year-old John Connor, and the i-950 unit Serena Burns to 2001 to kill the Connors and ensure Skynet's creation. Once John finds out about this, he sends the volunteering Kyle back to protect Sarah from the T-800 and a reprogrammed T-800 to protect his younger self from the T-1000. Afterwards, Skynet is effectively destroyed and John is greeted by Sarah, Dieter, and the remaining Resistance members as they are relieved that the great ordeal is finally over.

== I-950 ==
Unlike the T series Terminators, the I series are not factory built machines. Skynet decided that the best way for one of its terminators to act human was to start out with a human and add technological enhancements where necessary. The I-950 starts out as a baby with a neural net processor attached to its brain, providing an uplink to Skynet. To condition it physically, it is coaxed with holographic toys to crawl until it is exhausted. After four years, it is given an injection that rapidly ages it to maturity to finish its training. In an effort to blend in better with humans, the I-950 is allowed to feel emotions, but the range is limited by one of its cybernetic implants. Because it is far more human than machine, dogs are not alerted to its presence, and the infiltrator can go undetected for extremely long periods of time inside a resistance base.

The I-950s carry Model 101 CPU's in case they are needed, as well as power cells. Once the "living" portion of the I-950 is dead, the CPU then takes control of the body, but can only do so for a short time. They can reproduce with other I-950s but not humans. If the female I-950 decides that the pregnancy would stop them from carrying out their mission, they could fertilize their eggs in vitro and would be implanted in human surrogate wombs. They are also able to clone themselves.

== Characters ==
- Sarah Connor: Sarah, now living under the assumed name Suzanne Krieger (the German word for "warrior"), lives in Paraguay while hiding from the U.S. government with her son John.
- John Connor: John is now 16, attending military school and attempting to lead a normal life, after his destiny is apparently re-written when Skynet was last defeated.
- Dieter von Rossbach: An Austrian ex-counterterrorism operative, and the eventual model for the appearance of the T-800 Model 101 series of Terminators, who joins the Connors on their quest to destroy Skynet once and for all (It is established during the novel that he was confirmed to be in two specific locations during the events of the first two movies, hence explaining why he was never called in for questioning regarding the T-800's actions as his superiors always knew that he wasn't where the T-800 was). He is also Sarah Connor's eventual love interest and husband therefore becomes John Connor's stepfather.
- Serena Burns: The I-950 Infiltrator unit sent back to the present to kill the Connors and secure the birth of Skynet.
- Jordan Dyson: The brother of Miles Dyson and an FBI agent, obsessed with finding out the facts of his brother's death and bringing Sarah Connor and John Connor to justice, before he witnesses the I-950 and the Terminators in action and learns the truth about them.

== Reception ==
Publishers Weekly reviewed T2: Infiltrator and says the author gets the details of the Terminator universe right and thought the story made sense that tells how Skynet, after two failures, would try again to kill John Connor. Charles de Lint with The Magazine of Fantasy & Science Fiction magazine recommended T2: Infiltrator, saying, "Everything we need for a strong sequel is here." Lars Johansen with Parsec magazine also recommended the novel, saying that Stirling "has met the challenge" of writing a novel based on a movie "and whupped it."

SF Crowsnest reviewer Laura Kayne enjoyed T2: The Future War and praised how the story ties in with the first two Terminator films.
