= Roland Kickinger =

Austrian bodybuilder and actor

- Born: March 30, 1968 (age 58); Vienna, Austria
- Occupation: Actor
- Years active: 1997–present
- Height: 6 ft 4 in (193 cm)

Roland Kickinger (born March 30, 1968) is an Austrian actor and bodybuilder from Vienna. Standing 6 ft 4 in tall (1.93 m) and weighing from 250 to 300 pounds (113 to 136 kg), he has appeared in numerous bodybuilding competitions, fitness magazines and training videos. He is best known for his roles in Terminator Salvation and Son of the Beach.

== Acting career ==
From 2000 to 2002, Kickinger played Chip Rommel in the television series Son of the Beach.

Kickinger then collaborated with songwriter/guitarist Dale Buchanan to release pop rock music under the band name The Floaters in 2002.

He also played the young version of fellow Austrian-American, Arnold Schwarzenegger, in the 2005 TV movie See Arnold Run, which later led to him appearing in the 2009 film Terminator Salvation as a prototype of the T-800 (with Schwarzenegger's likeness digitally applied over his own). He also had minor roles in the films Street Warrior and Disaster Movie, both released in 2008.

== Filmography ==
| Year | Title | Role | Notes |
|---|---|---|---|
| 1998 | An Eye for Talent | Doorman | Short film |
| 1998 | Lethal Weapon 4 | Detective | Uncredited role |
| 1999 | Gone to Maui | Schulz | |
| 2001 | Skippy | Bodybuilder | |
| 2001 | 15 Minutes (Short film) | Austrian | Uncredited role |
| 2002 | Shoot or Be Shot | Sven | |
| 2005 | Candy Paint | Moe Petrowski | Short film |
| 2005 | See Arnold Run | Arnold Schwarzenegger | |
| 2006 | Against Type' | Jake Stackley | |
| 2007 | Andrea: Heart of the Giant | Edouard Carpentier | |
| 2008 | Street Warrior | Showman | |
| 2008 | Disaster Movie | Hulk | |
| 2009 | Raven | John Salem | |
| 2009 | Terminator Salvation | T-800 | |
| 2009 | Peraanmai | Anderson | Indian Tamil language film |
| 2010 | Sebastian | Tony | |
| 2011 | The Program | Cilas | Television film |
| 2011 | Alone | Grenne | Short film |
| 2012 | Blow Me | | Short film |
| 2018 | Groomzilla | Ox | Television film |
| 2018 | Heart Of Everest | Himself | Documentary |
| 2021 | Fourth Grade | Ronnie Adams | |
| 2021 | David Mirisch, the Man Behind the Golden Stars | Himself | Documentary |

=== Television ===
- 1997: Hang Time- As Body Builder (1 episode, "Sexual Harassment")
- 1997-1998: Team Knight Rider - As Roland (2 episodes)
- 1998: The Secret Diary of Desmond Pfeiffer - As Lars (1 episode, "Saving Mr. Loncoln")
- 1999: Caroline in the City - As Lars (1 episode, "Caroline and the Big Bad Bed")
- 1999: Home Improvement - As Dolph Schnetterling (1 episode, "Love's Labor Lost: Part 1")
- 1999-2000: Shasta McNasty - As big weightlifter/Buff Denis (2 episodes)
- 2000-2001: The Howard Stern Radio Show - Himself (2 episodes)
- 2000-2001: Howard Stern - Himself (2 episodes)
- 2000-2002: Son of the Beach - As Chip Rommel (42 episodes)
- 2001: The Test - As Himself/Panelist (1 Episode, "The Social Science Test")
- 2003: The King of Queens - As Vin (1 episode, "Affidavit Justice")
- 2004: The Help - As Adolf (1 episode, "Dwayne Gets a Cold")
- 2005-2006: Unfabulous As Sven (4 episodes)
- 2006: The Closer - As Hoyt (1 episode, "Out of Focus")
- 2008: Asia Uncut - Himself (1 episode)
- 2009: The Jace Hall Show - Himself (1 episode, "Sanctuary & Terminator Salvation")
- 2009: According to Jim - As Sven (1 episode, "Physical Therapy")
- 2010: Chuck - As a Volkoff Industries security Guard (1 episode, "Chuck Versus the Aisle of Terror")
- 2012: Cardio World - Himself (1 episode, "Lift Weights!... to get Smaller?")
- 2015: Big Time In Hollywood, FL - Fake Alan (1 Episode, "Monkey Largo")
- 2021: Knight's End - Wutan (2 Episodes)
