= Terminator (character) =

Terminator franchise character

- Terminator character
- Arnold Schwarzenegger as the Terminator in Terminator 2: Judgment Day (1991)
- First appearance: The Terminator (1984)
- Last appearance: Terminator Zero (2024)
- Created by: James Cameron; Gale Anne Hurd
- Portrayed by: Arnold Schwarzenegger (Note: Appears in Terminator Salvation (2009) through digital recreation only.)
- Voiced by: Mark Moseley; (The Redemption); Chris Cox; (Mortal Kombat 11); Timothy Olyphant; (Terminator Zero)
- Body doubles: Roland Kickinger (Salvation); Brett Azar (Genisys, Dark Fate)

In-universe information
- Aliases: Uncle Bob (Terminator 2: Judgment Day, T2); Guardian, Pops (Terminator Genisys); Carl (Terminator: Dark Fate)
- Species: Cyborg/Artificial intelligence (human tissue-grafted robotic endoskeleton)
- Gender: Male human tissue exterior
- Occupation: Assassin, infiltrator (The Terminator, Salvation, Genisys, and Dark Fate); Bodyguard (Judgment Day, Rise of the Machines, Genisys, and Dark Fate)
- Manufacturer: Cyberdyne Systems
- Machine designation: Model 101 (The Terminator, Judgment Day, Genisys, Dark Fate); T-850 (Rise of the Machines); T-800 (Salvation, Genisys, Dark Fate)

The Terminator, also known as a Cyberdyne Systems Model 101 or T-800, is the name of several film characters from the Terminator franchise portrayed by Arnold Schwarzenegger. The Terminator itself is part of a series of machines created by Skynet, an artificial intelligence, for infiltration-based surveillance and assassination missions. It is a cyborg, with a tough computer-controlled metal endoskeleton covered in living tissue.

The first appearance of the Terminator was as the titular antagonist in The Terminator, a 1984 film directed and co-written by James Cameron. While the original Terminator was destroyed, other machines with the same appearance are featured in the sequels. In Terminator 2: Judgment Day (1991) and Terminator 3: Rise of the Machines (2003), Schwarzenegger's Terminator serves as the main protagonist, while in Terminator Genisys (2015) and Terminator: Dark Fate (2019), it serves as a supporting protagonist, and is pitted against other Terminators sent by Skynet and its successor Legion.

In Terminator Salvation (2009) and Dark Fate, the character also appears briefly as an antagonist. In the context of the stories, the plot device of having various robots looking the same provides a certain continuity for the human characters by exploiting their emotional familiarity with a particular "human" visage associated with each "model". The "Terminator" title is also used as a generic name for other human-simulating characters in the Terminator franchise, such as the liquid-metal T-1000 antagonist in Judgment Day.

The Terminator is Schwarzenegger's best-known role, and resulted in two catchphrases, "I'll be back" and "Hasta la vista, baby", used in the first and second film respectively.

== Fictional background ==
A Terminator is an infiltration-based assassin, described in the films as a cybernetic organism. They are built in the future by Skynet, an artificial intelligence engaged in a war against humans. This model, often designated as the T-800, is the successor to the T-600 series, which had artificial rubber skin and was easily spotted by members of the human resistance.

T-800 models are all identical in appearance: a muscular, male human exterior made up of living tissue, covering a metal endoskeleton actuated by a powerful network of hydraulic servomechanisms, which provide superhuman strength. In the Terminator sequels, armies of skinless T-800 endoskeletons are shown to be used by Skynet during future war sequences, serving as soldiers rather than infiltrators. With the exterior appearance applied, they are the first Terminator model capable of blending in with humans; as a result, the resistance began using dogs to detect them, since the animals became agitated and barked loudly in their presence.

In the first film, a Terminator travels back in time from 2029 to 1984 to alter the past by killing Sarah Connor, retroactively ensuring victory for Skynet. Kyle Reese, a future soldier sent back to stop the Terminator, describes the latter as such:

The Terminator is an infiltration unit, part man, part machine. Underneath it's a hyperalloy combat chassis, microprocessor-controlled, fully armored, very tough. But outside it's living human tissue. Flesh, skin, hair, blood, grown for the cyborgs.

Reese adds that Terminators are capable of exhibiting behavior such as sweating and bad breath, in order to more effectively pass as human. The skin is prone to aging and injury related deterioration, but can heal itself with enough time. According to early drafts for the original film, a Terminator must consume small amounts of food to maintain the human skin, a detail that is absent in the finished film.

A Terminator can withstand normal 20th century firearms, crash through walls with little to no damage, and survive explosions to some degree. Repeated shotgun blasts have enough force to knock down and temporarily disable the cyborg, while heavy amounts of automatic fire are able to compromise the organic disguise layer. Terminators can continue functioning even after losing one or more limbs. Reese describes the Terminator's relentlessness to Sarah in the first film:

It can't be bargained with. It can't be reasoned with. It doesn't feel pity, or remorse, or fear! And it absolutely will not stop, ever, until you are dead!

The Terminator's CPU is an artificial neural network with the ability to learn and adapt. For instance, in the original film, it learns how to swear from a group of punks it encounters. In Terminator 2: Judgment Day, the character states, "The more contact I have with humans, the more I learn." A deleted scene from the second film, restored in the Special Edition, provides more backstory on the Terminator's learning ability; the character says that Terminators are set to read-only, a measure taken by Skynet to prevent them from "thinking too much". Sarah and John then activate its learning ability, after which it becomes more curious and begins trying to understand and imitate human behavior. It ultimately learns "the value of human life" as mused by Sarah in the closing narration of the theatrical cut. Later films in the series further humanize the character.

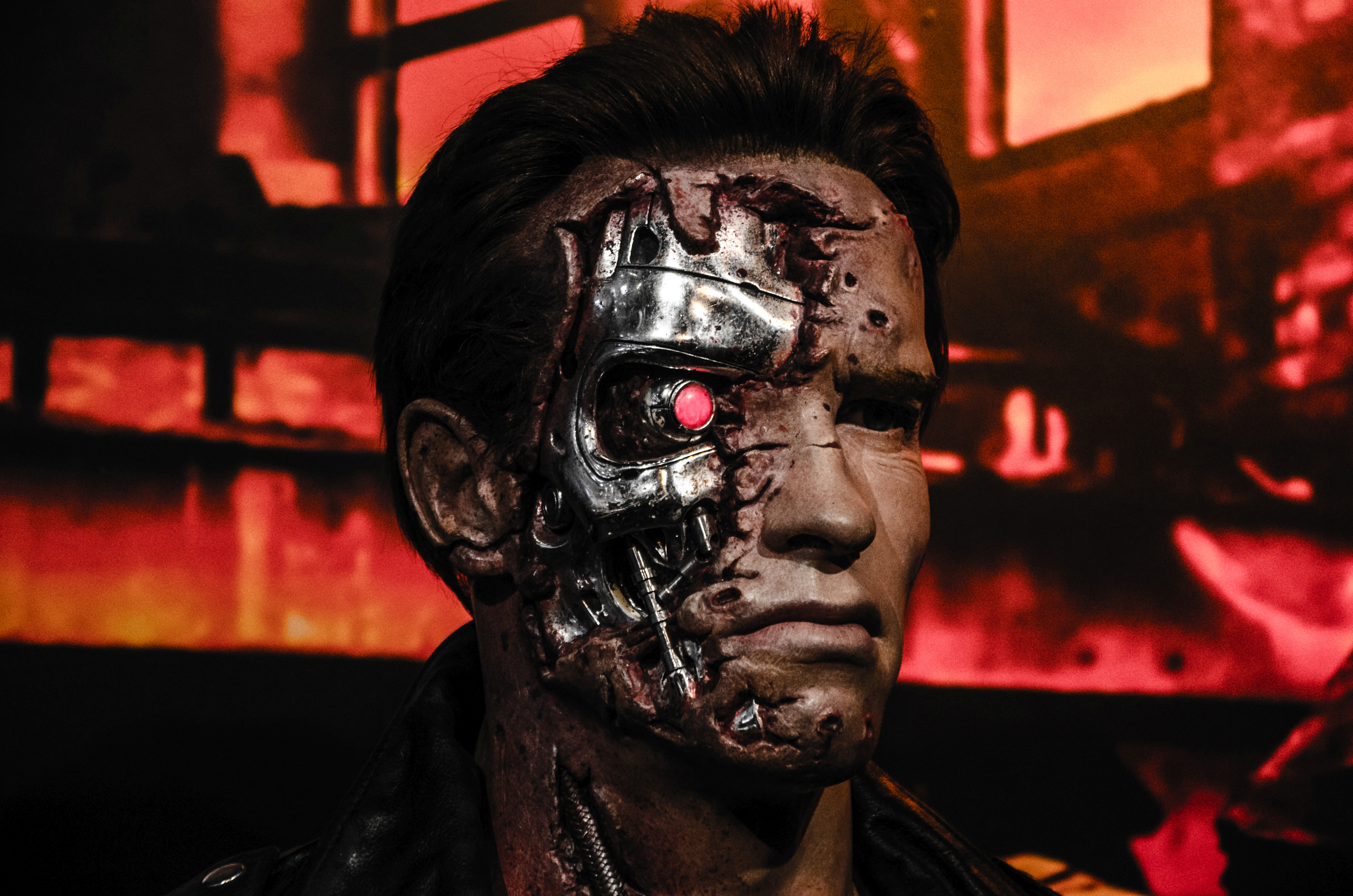
A Terminator figure at Madame Tussauds London, demonstrating the metallic interior and red eyes

Throughout the series, the Terminator is typically depicted wearing sunglasses and a leather jacket. Another trait persistent throughout the series is the faint red glow of the "eyes" when the cyborg is online; the lack of the glow has been used to show when one is out of action. The Terminator has an Austrian accent but can also copy the voice of others.

In the second film, the Terminator states that he can operate for 120 years on his power cell. In the third film, the Terminator is slightly modified, operating on two hydrogen fuel cells; when damaged, these explode with enough force to produce a small mushroom cloud. This iteration of the character also has an understanding of basic psychology.

=== Nomenclature ===
Commonly known as the Terminator, the character is also given more specific designations, which help distinguish from other mass-produced Terminators seen in each of the sequels.

In the first two films and Terminator: Dark Fate, the character is referred to as a "Cyberdyne Systems Model 101", referencing the Cyberdyne Systems company which created Skynet. In Terminator 3: Rise of the Machines (T3), he is referred to as a "T-850". This name also occurs throughout the T2 novels. A slight variation, "T101", was used as early as 1991, in the Amstrad CPC and ZX Spectrum versions of the Terminator 2 computer game.

The name "T-800" had been used off-screen in news articles and reviews for Terminator 2, differentiating from the film's other Terminator character, the T-1000. The T-800's heads-up display in the film specifically identifies him as a "Cyberdyne Systems Series 800 Model 101 Version 2.4". The novelization of the third film refers to the character by a different designation: a T-850 rather than a T-101, described as a newer, upgraded version of the T-800. Both T-800 and T-850 were used in merchandising for the film series. Terminator Salvation has the first on-screen usage of the term T-800, which is also used in Terminator Genisys.

Because the Terminator is portrayed by Arnold Schwarzenegger, the character is sometimes referred to as the Arnold Terminator, distinguishing from other Terminators played by different actors. Some of the Terminators portrayed by Schwarzenegger are also given on-screen nicknames. In Terminator 2, John Connor introduces the Model 101 to his mother's friends as his "Uncle Bob". In Terminator Genisys, Sarah Connor refers to the T-800 as "Pops", while the end credits list him as "Guardian". In Terminator: Dark Fate, the character goes by the name "Carl".

In the Terminator 2 DVD commentary, director and franchise creator James Cameron states that all Model 101s look like Schwarzenegger, with a 102 resembling someone else, leading to fan speculation that the 101 refers to the physical appearance while the 800 refers to the endoskeleton common to many models.

=== Character origin ===
The origin of the Terminator's physical and vocal templates is provided in the 2001 novel T2: Infiltrator, in the form of former counter-terrorist Dieter von Rossbach, who meets and joins forces with the Connors in the present. The novel reveals that he was never questioned about the Terminators' actions, as his superiors always knew that he was somewhere else during the rampages. The reason stated for copying Dieter was that Skynet was looking in the old military files for someone whose body could effectively conceal the Terminator's massive endoskeleton. The voice was provided through Kurt Viemeister, the scientist that taught Skynet its sentience.

A different origin is provided in a humorous deleted scene for Terminator 3, removed by director Jonathan Mostow who found it too comedic. In the scene, the Terminator's human appearance is said to be based on that of Chief Master Sergeant William Candy, also portrayed by Schwarzenegger but with a dubbed-over Southern accent, which would be replaced in-universe by the more menacing Austrian-accented voice of one of the developers.

When asked in 2017 why all T-800s look the same, Cameron suggested that Skynet had harvested the DNA from a human who had the same appearance, stating "it has flashed through my mind that there has to have been a prototype. [...] Now, the question is, did that person have some sort of meaning to Skynet on why they chose that one? Or was it like a whole rack of Terminators and the one that happened to be the Arnold model just happened to be closest to the door going out to the time displacement center and all the others looked different? I've asked myself these questions but it's never been resolved".

== Appearances ==
The Terminator appears in all six films of the franchise, each one featuring a different individual with the same likeness. The Terminator is an antagonist in the original film, and generally portrayed as a protagonist in the sequels. Every iteration of the character is destroyed at the end of each film, with the exception of Terminator Genisys.

=== The Terminator (1984) ===
The Model 101 is sent back in time from 2029 to 1984 to terminate Sarah Connor (Linda Hamilton), thereby preventing the birth of her son, John Connor, the future leader of the Human Resistance. Lack of surviving records in the future meant that it was limited to only knowing Sarah's name and that she lived in Los Angeles at the time, with the result that it killed two other Sarah Connors in the city before finding its target. As a result, Kyle Reese (Michael Biehn), a soldier sent from 2029 to protect Sarah, is able to find her before it does.

During several skirmishes, the Terminator withstands contemporary gunfire with only superficial damage to its exterior tissue. It is later caught in a fuel tanker explosion, which burns away its flesh covering to expose its mechanical nature and causes minor damage to one of its legs, slowing it down. Kyle sacrifices himself to damage the Terminator with a pipe bomb that destroys its legs and one hand, and Sarah crushes the remaining endoskeleton in a hydraulic press to shut it down permanently.

=== Terminator 2: Judgment Day (1991) ===
A Model 101 is reprogrammed by the future John Connor (Michael Edwards), and sent back to 1995 to protect young John (Edward Furlong) from a T-1000 (Robert Patrick), an advanced shapeshifting Terminator made of liquid metal that has been dispatched to kill him. The Model 101 is programmed to follow John's orders and works with the Connors to prevent Judgment Day; John also prohibits it from killing innocent humans who stand in their way, so the cyborg instead uses non-lethal force. During its time with the Connors, this Model 101 is taught how to speak in slang-like terms, such as "Hasta la vista, baby", and encouraged to act more human, to the point that it develops into an almost fatherly role for John. Sarah reflects that the Model 101 is the first "male" figure John has ever had in his life who can be guaranteed to always be there for him.

The T-1000 chases the trio into a steel mill and overpowers the Model 101 in hand-to-hand combat, impaling it through the chest and destroying its main power supply. However, the Model 101 activates a backup power source, frees itself, and blasts the T-1000 into a vat of molten steel with a grenade launcher to destroy it.

Prior to the film's events, Cyberdyne Systems had recovered a forearm and the damaged CPU chip from the Terminator in 1984 and used those components to radically advance its research and technology, which eventually led to the creation of Skynet in 1997. In Terminator 2, John steals the items from Cyberdyne's research lab and later throws them into the vat to destroy them. Because it cannot self-terminate, the Model 101 has Sarah lower it into the steel in order to destroy its CPU as well and thus prevent the technology from being used to create Skynet.

=== Terminator 3: Rise of the Machines (2003) ===
Despite the events of the second film, Judgment Day was merely delayed. A T-850 Terminator is eventually reprogrammed by the human resistance and sent to the 2000s, this time to protect John Connor (Nick Stahl) and his future wife Kate Brewster (Claire Danes) from Skynet's T-X (Kristanna Loken), which is also designed to destroy other Terminators. The T-850 is powered by two hydrogen fuel cells, one of which it discards after being damaged by the T-X.

Eventually, the T-X uses its nanites to take control of the T-850's autonomous functions, sending it to kill John and Kate. Since the T-850's core consciousness is still intact and it just lacks physical control of its body, John is able to incite it to shut down by noting the conflict between its current actions and its programmed mission. The T-850 later reboots itself free from the T-X's control. As John and Kate retreat to a bunker to wait out the now-inevitable nuclear war, the T-850 battles the T-X, using its remaining fuel cell to destroy them both in a massive detonation.

This T-850 is revealed to have killed John in 2032, having been chosen due to John's emotional attachment to the prior, identical-looking model in Terminator 2. After being captured by the resistance, the T-850 was reprogrammed to follow Kate's orders, as she succeeded John after his death.

=== Terminator Salvation (2009) ===
The T-800 (Roland Kickinger) has a small role, though once again as an antagonist. Near the end of the film, the T-800 engages John Connor (Christian Bale) in battle during John's attempt to rescue Kyle Reese (Anton Yelchin) from the Skynet base in San Francisco. John holds his own with his advanced weaponry, but is unable to stop the Terminator until the latter is drenched in molten metal and then liquid nitrogen, freezing him temporarily. As John begins planting hydrogen fuel cells, cyborg prototype Marcus Wright (Sam Worthington) arrives to stall the T-800. The Terminator is able to incapacitate Marcus long enough to stab John through the abdomen. Marcus awakens and soon destroys the T-800. The fuel cells are set off as John and Marcus escape, destroying the base and a number of unfinished T-800s.

=== Terminator Genisys (2015) ===
Terminator Genisys follows the early events of the first film before diverging into an alternate timeline, ignoring all previous sequels. In the film, a T-800 was reprogrammed by an unknown party some time in the future and sent to 1973, to protect nine-year-old Sarah Connor (Emilia Clarke) from a T-1000. After her parents are killed, the T-800 becomes her surrogate father and raises her to prepare for her future destiny, similar to the relationship between the Terminator and the young John Connor in Terminator 2. The T-800, which Sarah refers to as "Pops", has experienced an unprecedented level of emotional development, to the extent that it keeps her childhood drawings and photographs.

In the film, it is speculated that the knowledge of who sent Pops back was deliberately erased from its memory so that Skynet (Matt Smith) could not track them down later. Pops integrates into human society, and at one point obtains a job as a construction worker to build the headquarters for Cyberdyne Systems. Throughout the film, it struggles with physical limitations due to increasing age, but states several times that it is, "Old, not obsolete." Like the Terminator in the second film, Pops has been prohibited from killing humans.

After Kyle Reese's (Jai Courtney) arrival in 1984, the trio defeat the T-1000 (Lee Byung-hun). Later, in 2017, they battle John Connor (Jason Clarke), who has been transformed into a T-3000 tasked to ensure Skynet's rise. After multiple confrontations, Pops attempts to sacrifice itself to destroy the T-3000, telling Kyle Reese, "Protect my Sarah". During the battle, Pops is thrown into a vat of liquid metal before the T-3000's defeat, and as a result gains shapeshifting abilities like the T-1000. Pops then gives its approval of Sarah and Kyle's relationship.

A youthful T-800 (Brett Azar), looking like the one in the first film, is also intercepted by the aging T-800 and Sarah after arriving in the alternate 1984. Before the T-1000 is destroyed, he reactivates and reprograms the younger cyborg to pursue Kyle, who blows its head off. The young T-800's endoskeleton is dissolved in hydrochloric acid, and its CPU is used to operate Sarah and the older Terminator's time machine. The CPU is destroyed after the machine's usage, and with the older Terminator's existence concealed, Cyberdyne's plan for an A.I. (eventually named Genisys) is delayed until 2017.

=== Terminator: Dark Fate (2019) ===
In Terminator: Dark Fate, a direct sequel to Judgment Day, Schwarzenegger plays a T-800 called "Carl". Originally one of a series of Terminators sent back by Skynet to kill John Connor before its erasure, the Terminator that would become Carl successfully tracked down and killed John in Livingston, Guatemala in 1998. With its sole mission complete and with Skynet no longer existing, the T-800 is left purposeless. In time, it became self-aware, realized it was free from Skynet, assumed the name Carl, and began exhibiting behavior much like humans.

Months after killing John, Carl experienced compassion towards an abused woman, Alicia, and chose to rescue her and her child, Mateo, from her uncaring husband. Carl becomes a father figure to Mateo, although its relationship with Alicia is non-sexual. Carl's role as a family man gave him some idea of what had been taken from Sarah when it murdered her son, and the memory of John's death torments Carl to the point of being repentant. At some point, Carl established a drapery business in Laredo, Texas, where the family lives in a cabin. Over twenty years, Carl ages significantly, developing an advanced demeanor and social skills that become increasingly indistinguishable from those of an actual human.

Since John's death, Carl used its awareness of "chrono displacements" and sent Sarah text messages with the GPS coordinates of where and when other time-traveling Terminators would arrive. Carl intended to give Sarah a purpose by allowing her the chance to destroy the other Terminators, which Carl felt would give John's death some form of meaning. It keeps track of Sarah's whereabouts to make sure she survives her hunts, helping Sarah while also hiding from her. In 2020, Sarah decides to help Dani Ramos escape the Rev-9, a new class of Terminator sent from 2042 by a Skynet-analogous A.I. called Legion. The women also meet Grace, a cybernetically augmented future soldier who was sent to protect Dani, who will later lead the human resistance against Legion.

They later meet Carl and learn it had been sending Sarah the coordinates. Although Sarah hates Carl for the murder of her son, Dani convinces her that they need its help to destroy the Rev-9. Sarah concedes, but vows to destroy Carl after they stop the Rev-9, and Carl says he understands her intention. They confront the Rev-9 in a hydro-electric dam, where Grace and Carl sacrifice themselves to stop him. Carl's last words are "For John," a message it always included in its text messages to Sarah.

=== Other appearances ===
The Terminator as a playable character in Mortal Kombat 11

Schwarzenegger reprised the role in the music video for "You Could Be Mine", a 1991 song by Guns N' Roses that is featured in Terminator 2. He also reprised the role for a theme park attraction known as T2-3D: Battle Across Time, which opened in 1996.

The character has also made appearances in numerous video games outside of the Terminator franchise. It is parodied in the side-scrolling shooter game Broforce (2015) as a playable character called the Brominator, with his appearance referencing Schwarzenegger.

The T-800 is also a guest playable character in the 2019 fighting game Mortal Kombat 11, available through the game's Kombat Pack bundle of downloadable content. Schwarzenegger's likeness is used for the character, but his voice is not. He is instead voiced by Chris Cox at the suggestion of Schwarzenegger. According to its biography, the Terminator in this game hails from the Dark Fate timeline.

In 2021, the T-800 became a character outfit in the online game Fortnite. In 2023, a second T-800 skin was released, this time featuring Schwarzenegger's likeness.

The T-800 and T-1000 are featured in Call of Duty: Vanguard (2021) and the initial version of Call of Duty: Warzone (2020) as playable operators. Both characters also make a parody appearance in the 2015 comedy film Hollywood Adventures.

== Production background ==
The Terminator concept was conceived by James Cameron, who directed and co-wrote the first film. It was produced by Gale Anne Hurd and released by Orion Pictures in 1984. The character was inspired by a fever dream that Cameron had two years earlier, involving a metallic entity holding kitchen knives.

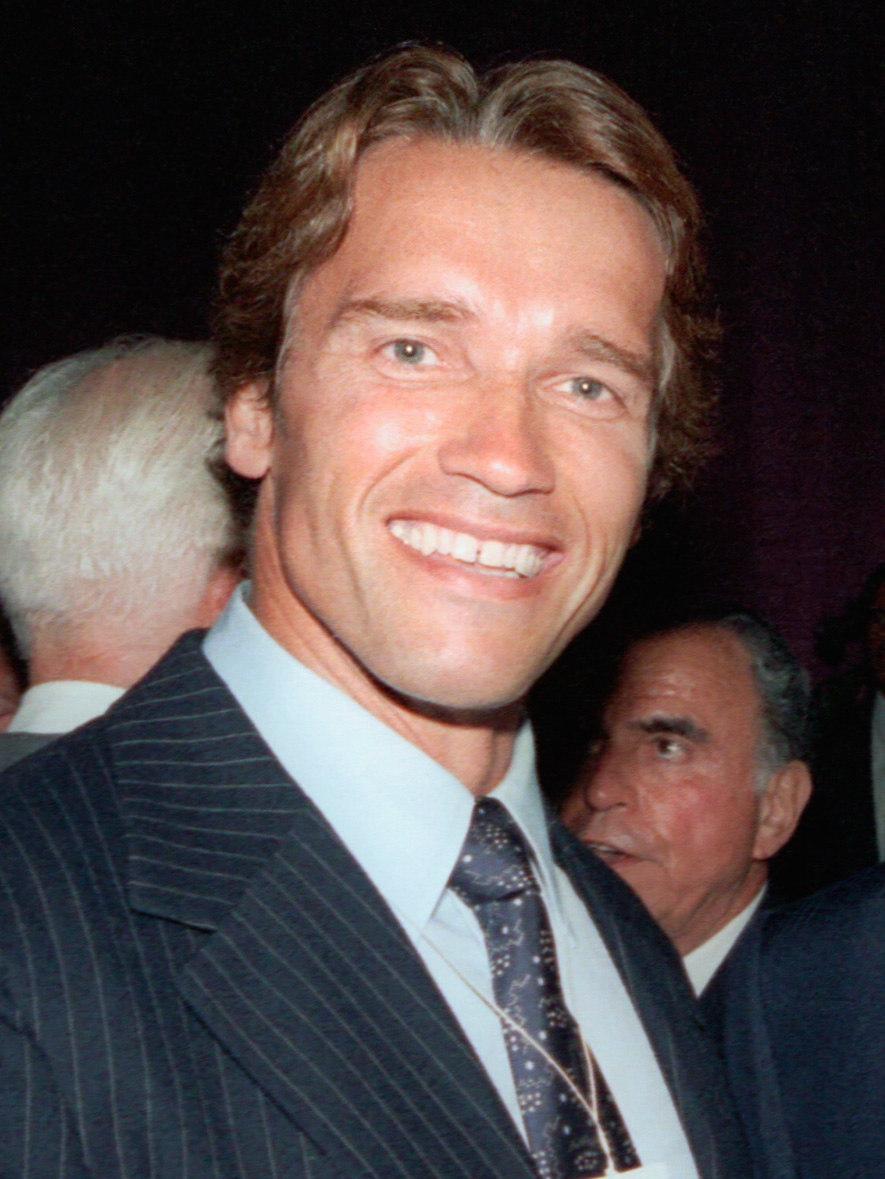
Arnold Schwarzenegger in 1984

Orion executive Mike Medavoy, in a phone call with Cameron, suggested that O. J. Simpson play the role of the Terminator, with Arnold Schwarzenegger as Kyle Reese. Cameron later recalled: "Gale Hurd and I looked at each other like that was the stupidest thing we'd ever heard in our lives. And I told him on that phone call, 'It's not O.J. Simpson. We're not doing that.'" Cameron also felt that Schwarzenegger was wrong for the role of Reese and quickly found him to be ideal as the Terminator instead.

According to Cameron, "Casting Arnold Schwarzenegger as our Terminator [...] shouldn't have worked. The guy is supposed to be an infiltration unit, and there's no way you wouldn't spot a Terminator in a crowd instantly if they all looked like Arnold. It made no sense whatsoever. But the beauty of movies is that they don't have to be logical. They just have to have plausibility."

Schwarzenegger prepared for the role with three months of weapons training. Cameron believed that Schwarzenegger's Austrian accent and deadpan delivery worked well in the film: "It had a strange synthesized quality, like they hadn't gotten the voice thing quite worked out." One of the Terminator's lines in the film, "I'll be back", became a popular catchphrase, although Schwarzenegger had difficulty saying it due to his accent.

Schwarzenegger in character for promotional art of Terminator 2: Judgment Day

After finishing the first film, Schwarzenegger suggested to Cameron that they make a sequel. An early idea for the next installment would have Schwarzenegger portraying two different T-800s from the future, one sent by Skynet to kill John Connor and the other sent by the resistance to protect him. However, co-writer William Wisher disliked the idea of identical Terminators fighting, which he found "boring". The antagonistic T-800 was eventually replaced by the T-1000. Schwarzenegger was initially hesitant about his role being switched to a protagonist for the sequel, an idea which Cameron devised in order to surprise audiences. Schwarzenegger later said, "I was very pleased with the twist and the idea of making the Terminator not kill anybody and become more of a human being. It added a great touch of sensitivity and sweetness to the whole movie."

Terminator 2: Judgment Day was released in 1991, and produced another catchphrase for Schwarzenegger's character: "Hasta la vista, baby". Cameron had no involvement in the next two films. Schwarzenegger initially refused to star in a third film without the involvement of Cameron, who later advised Schwarzenegger to reconsider. He eventually agreed to reprise the role for Terminator 3: Rise of the Machines, which was released in 2003. In the film, his character is depicted as an obsolete Terminator design compared with the T-X. Director Jonathan Mostow said, "It's always great if you can have your protagonist or hero be completely outmatched."

The films depict time travelers, including Terminators, as arriving from the future naked; the time machine is only capable of transporting organic material, preventing weapons and clothes from going through. Schwarzenegger, a bodybuilder, worked out daily to regain the same physique that he had during the previous films. He felt this was important: "Otherwise, people would say, 'He's lost it; he's all saggy and flabby,' and that would be all anyone would talk about it. I didn't want to be digitized, because someone would blab, and it would be in all the columns. So I just worked harder." After filming started, Schwarzenegger continued to work out during lunch breaks. He enjoyed performing his own stunts, including for a vehicular chase sequence early in the film.

In 2003, Schwarzenegger was elected as governor of California, which prevented his return in 2009's Terminator Salvation. However, the T-800 is featured briefly, with Schwarzenegger's likeness recreated through CGI. Cameron was consulted for 2015's Terminator Genisys, which featured the return of Schwarzenegger. His age is reflected in the film, with Cameron explaining to the filmmakers "that the outer covering (of the Terminator) was actually not synthetic, that it was organic and therefore could age."

Cameron returned to the franchise for Terminator: Dark Fate, released in 2019. He agreed to produce the film on the condition that Schwarzenegger return; other people involved in the project had suggested making the film without the actor. Schwarzenegger said, "I trained my ass off for the film. When you get to my age, you have to train twice as much to get the same result as you did 20 years ago."

Terminator endoskeleton built by Stan Winston for The Terminator

For Dark Fate, Cameron conceived the idea of a T-800 that is "just out there in this kind of limbo" for more than 20 years after carrying out an order, becoming more human "in the sense that he's evaluating the moral consequences of things that he did, that he was ordered to do back in his early days, and really kind of developing a consciousness and a conscience". Cameron found this iteration of the character more interesting than those featured in his first two films: "We've seen the Terminator that was programmed to be bad; you've seen the one that was programmed to be good, to be a protector. But in both cases, neither one of them have free will." Another idea from Cameron was for the film's T-800 to run a drapery business, referencing Schwarzenegger's real-life passion for interior decorating.

=== Effects ===
Aside from Schwarzenegger, the Terminator has also been depicted through the use of various effects. Cameron worked with effects artist Stan Winston to design the Terminator's metal endoskeleton. Winston created a full-scale model of the endoskeleton for the first film, while effects artist Gene Warren Jr. built a stop motion version for a sequence near the film's ending, in which it pursues Sarah and Kyle.

Winston returned to do endoskeleton work for the next two films. Molds of the original endoskeleton were used to create four new ones for Terminator 2, including two non-articulate versions and two others capable of movement. As in previous films, the character is again badly injured near the end of Terminator 3, this time revealing more of his metal interior than before. Winston achieved this look through the use of prosthetics and CGI. Full-scale endoskeleton models were made for the film, but only as a reference for digital artists.

For the T-800's appearance in Terminator Salvation, the character is depicted by bodybuilder Roland Kickinger, with Schwarzenegger's face superimposed on his during post-production. Another bodybuilder, Brett Azar, served as Schwarzenegger's body double in Terminator Genisys, portraying the younger Terminator who battles with Pops. Moving Picture Company looked through archive footage of young Schwarzenegger and digitally placed his face onto Azar's body. Azar returned as body double for the opening scene in Terminator: Dark Fate, with de-aging techniques used by Industrial Light & Magic to add a younger version of Schwarzenegger's face.

== Reception ==
=== Critical response ===
The first Terminator film was an unexpected success, and Schwarzenegger's eponymous character would go on to become his best-known role. According to Clark Collis of Empire, mainstream audiences had previously viewed Schwarzenegger as "little more than a joke, a mumbling behemoth whose grasp of both acting and the English language, appeared minimal at best." Variety found the character to be "perfectly cast", while Colin Greenland of Imagine called Schwarzenegger "eerily wonderful as the unstoppable cyborg." Marc Weinberg of Orange Coast wrote that it was "great to see such a pure, unstoppable villain [...]. The filmmakers make no attempt to humanize him with weaknesses or emotions."

David Ansen of Newsweek felt that Schwarzenegger was "born to play a machine," writing about Terminator 2, "Here, as an emotionless cyborg acting out the part of a foster father, he's impressive, hilarious, almost touching." Likewise, Hal Hinson of The Washington Post found his "wooden" performance ideal for the role: "It's comical, perhaps, but Schwarzenegger expresses more of his own humanity when playing a machine than he does when playing real people. [...] For once, he's ideally cast, and he brings the kind of delicacy of feeling that Boris Karloff showed as the Frankenstein monster. As a machine, he has soul."

In his review of Terminator 3, Mike Clark of USA Today wrote that Schwarzenegger "still looks spectacular, but the script is short on deadpan zingers, and his heart doesn't seem in it." Nathan Rabin of The A.V. Club wrote: "Like Anthony Hopkins' Hannibal Lecter, Arnold Schwarzenegger's Terminator has been spoofed, ripped off, and paid homage far too often to retain much of its original menace. Refreshingly, Mostow and company seem to understand that, and smartly use him as a comic figure". Todd McCarthy of Variety felt that this Terminator's "physical inferiority to his opponent [the T-X] invests Schwarzenegger with an unaccustomed underdog status that brings him closer to the viewer."

Some critics considered Terminator Salvation to be disappointing, citing Schwarzenegger's absence. Critic James Berardinelli found that it lacks a strong antagonist until the T-800's brief appearance near the end, calling it the film's high point. Terminator Genisys received generally negative reviews, although Schwarzenegger's return was praised.

Reviewing Terminator: Dark Fate, Angie Han of Mashable found Schwarzenegger to be the film's best aspect: "His deadpan delivery makes him distinctive, while the performance beneath it suggests an interiority deeper and more complicated than even the character himself seems able to comprehend." David Ehrlich of IndieWire wrote that the character "is smartly written, funny in a way 'Dark Fate' struggles to be without him, and perhaps the most fundamentally human character the franchise has ever seen." Richard Roeper, writing for the Chicago Sun-Times, stated, "It's impossible not to laugh at some of the Terminator's one-liners, but now it's as if he's in on the joke." Peter Bradshaw of The Guardian felt that Schwarzenegger was reprising "a character I always thought was fundamentally wrong: the nice Terminator, the Terminator on the side of the angels". Likewise, Cathal Gunning of Screen Rant believed that the character, once a threatening antagonist, had been "ruined" by repeated humanization attempts throughout the film series.

=== Accolades ===
Schwarzenegger was nominated twice for the Saturn Award for Best Actor, for his characters in The Terminator and Terminator 2. For the latter film, he also won Best Male Performance at the 1992 MTV Movie Awards.

In a 2003 list of 100 Heroes & Villains by the American Film Institute, the Terminator took two positions — number 48 as the hero and number 22 as the villain. Schwarzenegger himself presented the list on television, and said about his rankings, "I am absolutely ecstatic about it. To say you are one of the 50 favorite villains and one of the 50 favorite heroes in the history of American motion pictures, that is unbelievable, and I felt very honored."

In 2015, the Terminator ranked 28th in Empire's rating of 100 Greatest Film Characters.

== See also ==
- RoboCop (character)
