= T-1000 =

Robotic antagonist in "Terminator 2: Judgment Day"

- Terminator character
- The T-1000 in its liquid metal form in Terminator 2: Judgment Day (1991)
- First appearance: Terminator 2: Judgment Day (1991)
- Last appearance: Mortal Kombat 1 (2023)
- Created by: James Cameron; William Wisher Jr.
- Portrayed by: Robert Patrick (Terminator 2); Lee Byung-hun (Terminator Genisys)

In-universe information
- Species: Android
- Occupation: Terminator
- Manufacturer: Skynet
- Model: T-1000

The T-1000 is a fictional machine in the Terminator franchise. The first T-1000 was the main antagonist in the 1991 film Terminator 2: Judgment Day, portrayed by American actor Robert Patrick in what was his breakout role. Patrick briefly reprised the role for T2-3D: Battle Across Time, a 1996 theme park attraction. Another T-1000 is present in the 2015 film Terminator Genisys, a reboot of the series, with South Korean actor Lee Byung-hun in the role.

In the franchise, the T-1000 is a Terminator, a line of android assassins created by the artificial intelligence Skynet. In the future, Skynet is engaged in a war against humans, who are led by John Connor. In Terminator 2, the T-1000 is sent back in time to kill John while he is ten years old. The T-1000 is made up of a liquid metal, known in the film as mimetic polyalloy, which allows it to shapeshift into other people or objects that come into contact with it. The shapeshifting abilities have also been reused for subsequent machines in the Terminator franchise, including the T-X, the T-1001, and the Rev-9.

The liquid metal effects for T-1000 were created through computer-generated imagery by Industrial Light & Magic, and practical effects by Stan Winston. The character, including Patrick's performance and the visual effects required to depict it, were praised by critics. Since then, the T-1000 has been parodied or referenced in other media.

== Abilities ==
=== Shapeshifting ===
In Terminator 2: Judgment Day, the T-1000 is established as an advanced Terminator prototype. It is more sophisticated than the T-800, (Note: Identified in the early films as "Cyberdyne Systems Model 101", and also commonly known since then as the "Terminator" or a "T-800". See here for further information.) which consists of living human tissue over a metal endoskeleton. By contrast, the T-1000 is entirely made up of a liquid metal, known in the film as mimetic polyalloy, rendering it capable of shapeshifting and near-perfect mimicry of people and objects that come into contact with it. Although it possesses a default humanoid shape, it can assume alternative forms to fit through narrow openings. It can morph its arms into solid metal tools or bladed weapons, and flatten itself and imitate the pattern and texture of the ground to hide or to ambush targets.

The T-1000 can change its surface color and texture to convincingly simulate flesh, clothing, and other nonmetallic materials, but its morphing abilities are limited. It cannot transform into complex machines with moving parts or chemical fuels (such as guns or bombs), limiting it to stabbing weapons, and its volume prevents it from taking the form of a smaller object like a pack of cigarettes. It is capable of impersonating people larger than itself. Any pieces of its body that are broken off will liquefy and merge with the bulk of the T-1000 when it gets close enough.

The T-1000's abilities are further explained in the prologue of the film's novelization, which states that the machine is a "nanomorph" created through nanotechnology, able to scan the molecular structure of whatever it is touching and visually mimic it. At one point in the film, the T-1000 mimics an obese security guard, which "strained its ability" according to the novelization.

The T-1000's liquid metal allows the machine to recover quickly from damage, but is prone to malfunction after being frozen, as shown in the film's Special Edition DVD release. It is also susceptible to chemical damage, as shown in Terminator Genisys. In the latter film, it is also shown that the T-1000 can repair other Terminators by infusing them with liquid metal. It can also use its own body to form independent weapons and gadgets, such as a spear or a tracking device.

Other Terminators, including the T-X and the Rev-9, have an endoskeleton but, like the T-1000, also possess liquid metal and the shapeshifting ability. The latter features are also shared with the T-1001, which appears in the television series Terminator: The Sarah Connor Chronicles (2008–09).

=== Others ===
Besides its physical appearance, the T-1000 is also capable of accurately mimicking voices, including the ability to extrapolate a relatively small voice sample to generate a wider array of words or inflections as required. The T-1000 is able to pass as human, possessing a larger repertoire of behavioral expression and interpersonal skills than earlier Terminator models. It is apparently capable of espionage and detective skills, as it often attempts to accomplish its goals by subterfuge instead of brute force and extreme violence like the T-800. In Terminator 2, it primarily disguises itself as a police officer, allowing it to gain trust, access information, and provide a benign, friendly appearance. The T-1000 is an exceptionally fast runner. Like all Terminators, it also possesses superhuman strength, greater than that of the T-800, despite its more-slender frame and smaller stature.

== Appearances ==
=== Terminator 2: Judgment Day (1991) ===
In Terminator 2: Judgment Day, the T-1000 (portrayed by Robert Patrick) is sent back in time by Skynet, an artificial intelligence, to kill young John Connor (Edward Furlong). In the future, Connor leads the Human Resistance in a war against Skynet and its machines.

Upon arriving in the past, the T-1000 ambushes an officer of the Los Angeles Police Department (LAPD) and takes on his identity, tracking down John through the police cruiser's on-board computer and eventually locating him in a shopping mall. A T-800 (Arnold Schwarzenegger), sent by the Resistance to protect John, shows up in time to stop the T-1000. Following a brief scuffle and a lengthy truck chase, the T-800 and John escape from the T-1000.

The T-1000 visits John's home; kills and impersonates his foster mother, Janelle Voight (Jenette Goldstein); then kills her husband Todd (Xander Berkeley) when John calls home to warn them. The T-800 confirms that the Voights are dead by tricking the T-1000 into incorrectly naming John's dog.

At a mental hospital, the T-800 helps John rescue his institutionalized mother, Sarah Connor (Linda Hamilton), before the T-1000 can kill and copy her. After tracking the Connors and the T-800 to Cyberdyne Systems headquarters, it gives chase and crashes a truck carrying liquid nitrogen into a steel mill. The T-1000 is frozen solid by the leaking liquid nitrogen, allowing the T-800 to shatter it with a single pistol round, although the pieces are soon thawed by the heat of the steel mill. Extended versions of the film released on home video include scenes that depict the T-1000 developing a glitch in its mimicry abilities after being frozen/shattered/thawed. At times, its hands and feet briefly adhere to whatever it is touching and take on the appearance of those objects.

After the T-1000 reforms, the T-800 engages it in hand-to-hand combat, buying time for Sarah and John to flee, and the melee ends with the T-1000 impaling the T-800 through the chest and destroying its main power source. The T-1000 then continues the hunt for John, unaware that the T-800 has activated a backup power system.

Having briefly made contact with Sarah earlier by stabbing her through the shoulder, the T-1000 copies her appearance and voice and lures John to itself. The real Sarah arrives to stop it, driving it back with several shotgun blasts, and the T-800 then fires a round from an M79 grenade launcher into its chest. The ensuing detonation badly deforms the T-1000, throwing it off balance: it ultimately topples off a catwalk and falls into a vat of molten steel, where it melts and dissolves.

=== Terminator Genisys (2015) ===
A T-1000, with a different default human appearance, is featured briefly in Terminator Genisys, a reboot of the film series. It is revealed that Skynet sent the T-1000 to kill nine-year-old Sarah Connor (portrayed by Willa Taylor) in 1973. Although it killed her parents, she escaped and was found by a reprogrammed T-800 (Schwarzenegger), credited as "Guardian" and sent by an unknown party to protect her.

The same T-1000 is present in 1984, posing as an Asian American LAPD police officer (Lee Byung-hun). It intercepts Kyle Reese (Jai Courtney) upon his arrival from 2029. As Kyle has no experience battling a T-1000, he is unable to defeat it and breaks into a closed department store to flee. He is arrested by two police officers, and the trio are soon attacked by the T-1000. Kyle is rescued following the arrival of Sarah (Emilia Clarke) and the T-800 Guardian (Schwarzenegger) in an armored truck. By latching a piece of itself onto the truck, the T-1000 tracks the three to the Guardian's warehouse base. It masquerades as Reese in a failed attempt to fool Sarah, after which it launches an attack on the group, who destroy it using hydrochloric acid.

After Sarah and Reese travel to 2017, they are recognized by O'Brien, one of the police officers from 1984. His experience with the T-1000 leads him to believe their story about Skynet and free them from custody so they can stop Judgment Day. Near the film's end, the Guardian acquires T-1000 shapeshifting abilities after being exposed to liquid metal at Cyberdyne's headquarters.

=== Other appearances ===
Patrick reprised his role as the T-1000 in T2-3D: Battle Across Time, a 1996 movie ride created for Universal Studios theme parks. In this short film, the T-800 (Schwarzenegger) takes John Connor (Furlong) to 2029 to aid him in destroying Skynet once and for all. On their way, the T-1000 chases after them while they are on a motorcycle. They lose its pursuit after the T-800 shoots at it with a shotgun several times.

Two T-1000s appear in Terminator 2: Judgment Day – Nuclear Twilight, a 1996 comic published by Malibu Comics, in which they take on the appearance of a resistance soldier; one of them is then sent to the past to kill John Connor, as outlined in the film. In the simultaneously published Terminator 2: Judgment Day – Cybernetic Dawn, set just after the film, a female T-1000 and two T-800s come to the present to ensure Skynet's creation. A T-1000, featuring the same likeness from Terminator 2, is also featured in the 2011 comic Terminator/RoboCop: Kill Human. As in the film, the T-1000 targets John but now must also confront RoboCop.

Patrick reprised the role for imagery featured in the Terminator 2 arcade game (1991). The T-1000 and T-800 are also featured in the video games Call of Duty: Vanguard (2021) and the initial version of Call of Duty: Warzone (2020) as playable operators. In 2025, Patrick reprised the role of the T-1000 as a playable character in Mortal Kombat 1, through the Khaos Reigns downloadable content pack.

== Production background ==
Both the original film The Terminator (1984) and its sequel film, Terminator 2: Judgment Day (1991), were co-written and directed by James Cameron. The only antagonist in the franchise's first movie is a T-800, portrayed by Arnold Schwarzenegger.

In late-1989, an early idea for the sequel would have Schwarzenegger portraying two identical but different T-800 copies from the future, the first copy sent back in time by Skynet once again to complete his mission by assassinating John Connor, and a second copy who was hacked by the resistance to also send him back in the same timeline on a mission to protect John. However, co-writer William Wisher found that pitch to be "boring".

The film's antagonist since early-1990 eventually became the shapeshifting T-1000 which was based on a scrapped machine antagonist that was originally planned for the first Terminator film, but the studio lacked both the budget, ambition, and clay-mation special effects at the time. Describing his early vision of the sequel, Cameron referred to the T-1000 as an "experimental, one-off super weapon" that even Skynet is "terrified to use."

The T-1000 primarily masquerades as an Los Angeles Police Department officer, so "he can go places and do things" without being questioned, according to Wisher. Cameron said, "That was just me having fun with an authority figure. But there is a thematic point to that, which is that we, as human beings, become terminators. We learn how to have zero compassion." Teaser trailers for Terminator 2 deliberately withheld that the T-1000 was the villain and the T-800 was now the protector.

Robert Patrick as the T-1000 in Terminator 2: Judgment Day

Robert Patrick was cast as the slender T-1000, a deliberate distinction from the muscular T-800. Cameron said, "I wanted to find someone who would be a good contrast to Arnold. If the 800 series is a kind of human Panzer tank, then the 1000 series had to be a Porsche." He said further, "I thought of it as an East meets West kind of energy, brute force versus the fluid."

Cameron's original pick to play the T-1000 was Michael Biehn, in a complete reversal of roles with Schwarzenegger, who was now portraying the hero. However, this idea was abandoned as it was judged too confusing for viewers who have watched the first Terminator film.

Then the rock musician Billy Idol was considered for the role, and storyboards had the android resembling him. However, a serious motorcycle accident prevented Idol from accepting the role, which required a prominent amount of running; Idol had been left with a temporary limp after the accident. He later expressed doubt that he could have topped Patrick's "incredible cold veneer". Blackie Lawless, the lead singer of W.A.S.P., had also been considered for the role but he was deemed too tall.

At the time of his casting, Patrick had been privately battling a drug and alcohol addiction, which he gave up to prepare for the physically challenging role. He worked out to get into shape and had to maintain his new physique throughout production. The films depict time travelers, including Terminators, as arriving from the future naked; the time-travel mechanics prevent clothes from going through. A commuter train went by as Patrick was filming his nude arrival scene, and he called it the most embarrassing moment of his career.

For a machine-like performance, Patrick had to learn how to fire a pistol without flinching or blinking, and run effortlessly without heavy breathing or signs of exhaustion. The T-1000's distinctive run, developed by Patrick, shows the character with straight hands waving up and down, like blades preparing to strike a target. When not filming, Patrick primarily stayed to himself: "It was kind of a method thing, in the sense that I didn't want to be buddies with anyone. Even when I walked to set, I walked like the T-1000. I didn't want to lose the ability to portray it, so I kept it close to me." To perfect the T-1000's blank stare, Patrick studied predators such as eagles, cats, and sharks, and kept them in mind while filming.

Near the film's end, the T-1000 disapprovingly wags its finger at Sarah after she tries to kill it. This was done at the spontaneous, on-set suggestion of Cameron. Patrick later recalled: "I went with it, but the whole time we were shooting, I was battling with how self-aware was the T-1000? We were trying to leave no charismatic imprint on the role, other than just relentless pursuit. Portraying something without a lot of dialogue, it became all about physicality and body movement. I had to think about, 'How would this thing run? How would he move?' That was the battle, and I seriously considered, 'Would he wag his finger like that?'"

The T-1000 became Patrick's breakout role. As he recalled in 2017: "I kept getting offers to play another robot. I just couldn't do it, even though I didn't have any money. Budweiser wanted to do a commercial with me as the T-1000, but I couldn't do something like that to cheese up the legacy of 'T2.'" Patrick said he was "damn proud" of the film and his performance, and that he "would love for people to always remember" him as the T-1000, while adding, "I would also love if people appreciated some of the other movies I did as well."

=== Character's return ===
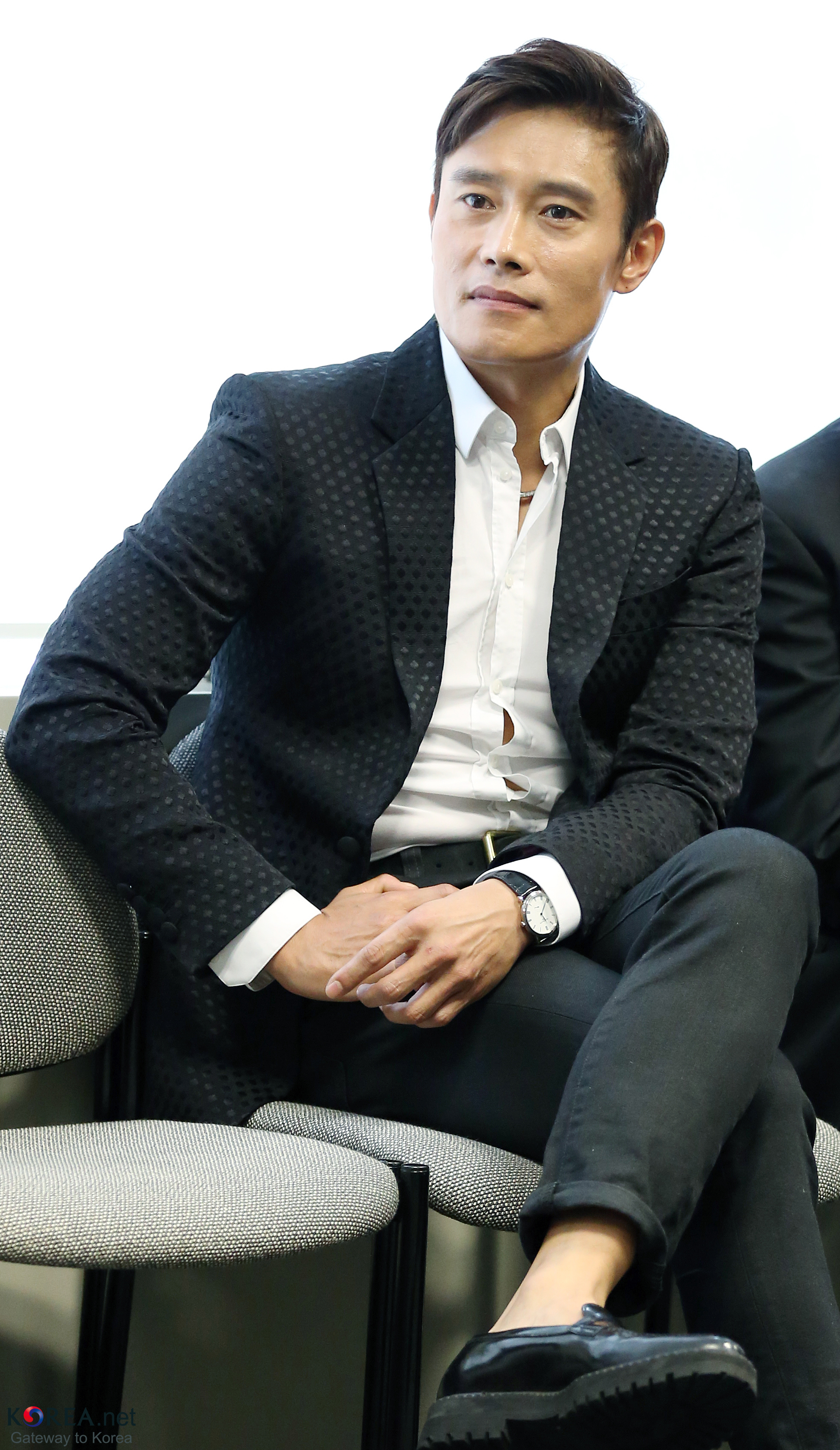
Lee Byung-hun played the T-1000 in Terminator Genisys

It would be years before the T-1000 returned to the film series. McG, the director of the 2009 film Terminator Salvation, said it would be reintroduced in what was to be his concept for the next film: "I like the idea and the perspective for the next picture that you meet Robert Patrick the way he looks today, and he's a scientist that's working on, you know, improving cell replication so we can stay healthier and we can cure diabetes and do all these things that sound like good ideas, and to once again live as idealized expressions as ourselves." He also said the origin story would satirize the world's "obsession" with youth and aging. This concept, however, was scrapped when the series was rebooted with the 2015 film Terminator Genisys, in which the T-1000 is portrayed by Lee Byung-hun.

Patrick said in 2019 that he had mixed feelings about returning as the T-1000 for another Terminator film, noting his age and the fact that it was a physically demanding role: "The whole character is the physicality, the way he moved and ran and walked, and all those things that made him iconic. Part of me says, no, that's it, I can't do it again. Part of me says, shit, maybe I could do it even better? I don't know."

=== Effects ===
Industrial Light & Magic (ILM) had previously worked on Cameron's 1989 film The Abyss, which had visual effects involving water, similar to the T-1000's liquid metal ability. For Terminator 2, ILM developed computer-generated imagery (CGI) to manipulate, re-create, and "morph" Patrick's image to produce the liquid metal effects. The computer graphics composed 6 of the 15 minutes that the T-1000 displays its morphing and healing abilities. The other 9 were achieved in camera with the use of advanced animatronic puppets and prosthetic effects created by Stan Winston and his team.

In Terminator Genisys, the effects of the T-1000 were made by British effects company Double Negative. The animation was mostly similar to how it was done in Terminator 2, only with more advanced fluid simulations. To properly depict the liquid metal being dissolved by acid, Double Negative's artists studied acid dissolving aluminum, and had its final distorted forms inspired by the 1982 film The Thing.

== Reception ==
Reviewing Terminator 2, Kim Newman of Empire wrote that Patrick's T-1000 "stands as one of the great monsters of the cinema." Roger Ebert of the Chicago Sun-Times called the T-1000 a "splendid villain" and praised the visual effects. Owen Gleiberman of Entertainment Weekly wrote, "The transformation effects are spectacular, in part because there's real magic to them, a sense of technological wonder. By the end of the movie, we feel that this shape-shifting terminator, this sinister mass of chameleonic metal, has an identity all its own."

Terminator 2 eventually won for Best Visual Effects at the 64th Academy Awards. Patrick was nominated for Best Villain at the 1992 MTV Movie Awards, but lost to Rebecca De Mornay for her role in The Hand That Rocks the Cradle. Patrick was also nominated for Best Supporting Actor at the 18th Saturn Awards, losing to William Sadler in Bill & Ted's Bogus Journey.

The T-1000 was ranked #39 in the Online Film Critics Society's 2002 list of the "Top 100 Villains of All Time". Ryan Lambie, writing for Den of Geek in 2011, said of Patrick's performance: "An amorphous embodiment of death, he brings an appropriately lizard-like sense of coldness to a role with minimal dialogue. There's something unforgettably nightmarish about the way Patrick moves in this film, whether he's prowling around shopping malls, or both sprinting and shooting at the same time." In 2018, Empire ranked the T-1000 at number 19 in its recounting of the best cinematic villains, writing that Patrick's performance "left an impact that helped push Terminator 2 beyond the original in terms of popularity."

Lee also received some praise for his T-1000 performance in Terminator Genisys. Eric Goldman of IGN called him "very compelling as a new T-1000", going on to write, "In fact, some of the film's best action scenes involve the T-1000, who remains an inventive, threatening movie villain. I actually found myself wishing Lee was in more of the movie, because he, and the still-exciting T-1000 morphing abilities, brings some of the most genuine thrills to it." Julian Roman of MovieWeb found Lee's performance memorable and called his limited screen time "a total head scratcher."

== In popular culture ==
Patrick's T-1000 has been parodied or referenced in other media, outside of the Terminator franchise, since its original appearance.

- Patrick as the T-1000 briefly appears in the 1992 film Wayne's World. In a scene where Wayne is pulled over for speeding, the T-1000 — dressed in a police uniform — pulls out a picture of John Connor and asks Wayne if he has seen him, in the same manner he did in Terminator 2. This results in Wayne screaming in terror and driving away.
- In the 1993 comedy Hot Shots! Part Deux, President Thomas "Tug" Benson defeats Saddam Hussein by spraying him with a fire extinguisher, upon which he and his dog freeze and crack into pieces, then melt and combine as in the iconic scene of Cameron's movie. Saddam then reforms with his dog's head, fur, nose and ears.
- Patrick also briefly appears as the T-1000 in the 1993 film Last Action Hero, seen walking out the LAPD building as Danny and Jack Slater (played by Schwarzenegger) are entering.
- "Salvage", a 2001 episode of The X-Files, focuses on a man made of metal. Patrick's character, FBI agent John Doggett, expresses doubt to fellow agent Dana Scully that such a thing is possible: "What are you saying? Ray Pearce has become some kind of metal man? 'Cause that only happens in the movies, Agent Scully."
- A hint is made toward Patrick's role as the T-1000 in the 2006 film The Marine. When gangster Bennett comments on Triton's tenacity in chasing them with the words "This guy is like the Terminator", his leader Rome (played by Patrick) fixes him with a gaze in their car's rearview mirror.
- Patrick appeared as the T-1000 in a DirecTV commercial.
- In the 2015 comedy Hollywood Adventures, Patrick portrays a Hollywood studio guard and parodies his T-1000 role.
- In "Local News Legend", a 2015 episode of Regular Show, the recurring character of local news reporter Jackie Carmichael (voiced by Jennifer Hale) is revealed to be a T-1000 from the future, who travelled back in time to bring destruction to local news, the only blemish on the utopian future.
- In "ATM", a 2023 episode of Reacher, Patrick's character Shane Langston is discussing with his hitman employee the pseudonyms used by Reacher and Neagley: Starlin Castro and Sarah Connor. While Langston knows that Castro was the name of a former Yankees player, when the hitman asks who Sarah Connor is, Langston responds: "I don't give a shit".
