= John Connor =

Fictional character in the Terminator franchise

- Terminator character
- First appearance: The Terminator (1984) (mentioned only); Terminator 2: Judgment Day (1991) (physical appearance)
- Last appearance: Terminator: Resistance (2019)
- Created by: James Cameron; Gale Anne Hurd; William Wisher Jr.
- Portrayed by: Adult: Michael Edwards (T2); Nick Stahl (T3); Christian Bale (Salvation); Jason Clarke (Genisys); Young: Edward Furlong (T2, T2-3D, Dark Fate) (Note: Furlong provides the facial motion capture for John in Dark Fate, with Jude Collie as a body double.); Child: Dalton Abbot (T2)
- Voiced by: Bruce DuBose (The Terminator: Dawn of Fate); Nick Stahl (Terminator 3: Rise of the Machines video game); Keith Ferguson (Terminator 3: The Redemption); Gideon Emery (Terminator Salvation video game); Aaron Kunitz (Dark Fate); Eric Meyers (Terminator: Resistance)

In-universe information
- Species: Human; Cyborg (Genisys)
- Gender: Male
- Occupation: Leader of the Resistance; Senator (T2 alternate ending); Assassin (Genisys)
- Affiliation: Resistance against the Machines / Tech-Com; United States Senate (T2 alternate ending); Cyberdyne Systems (Genisys); Skynet (Genisys)
- Family: Kyle Reese (father biological); Sarah Connor (mother); Derek Reese (uncle)
- Spouses: Tara Holden (comics); Katherine Brewster (Rise of the Machines and Salvation)
- Children: Kyle Reese (adoptive son; Terminator: Infinity comics); Sarah Connor. Jr (Terminator Salvation: The Final Battle comics); Kyle Connor (Terminator Salvation: The Final Battle comics); Kyla Connor (Terminator Dreams novel)
- Nationality: American

John Connor is a fictional character and the male protagonist of the Terminator franchise. Created by writer/director James Cameron, the character is first referred to in the 1984 film The Terminator and first appears in its 1991 sequel Terminator 2: Judgment Day (T2). In the character's first appearance, John is portrayed by Edward Furlong as a child, and briefly by Michael Edwards as an adult in a small role. Other actors have portrayed the character in subsequent films, including Nick Stahl, Christian Bale, and Jason Clarke. In addition, Thomas Dekker portrayed John Connor in the two-season television series Terminator: The Sarah Connor Chronicles.

The character serves as a protagonist in Terminator 2: Judgment Day (1991), Terminator 3: Rise of the Machines (2003), and Terminator Salvation (2009), the antagonist of the film Terminator Genisys (2015), and has a brief cameo in Terminator: Dark Fate (2019).

== Creation ==
In a 2021 interview, James Cameron said that the song "Russians" by Sting inspired him to create John Connor: "I remember sitting there once, high on E, writing notes for Terminator, and I was struck by Sting’s song, that "I hope the Russians love their children too." And I thought, "You know what? The idea of a nuclear war is just so antithetical to life itself." That’s where the kid came from."

== Terminator film series ==
In the fictional universe's narrative, John Connor is a messianic figure (born on February 28, 1985) who will lead the Resistance to defeat an empire of robotic Terminators amassed by the rogue military AI Skynet following a cybernetic revolt doomsday event known as Judgment Day. When his mother, Sarah Connor, is the target of a time traveling Terminator unit (Model 101) in the first film, John sends resistance fighter Kyle Reese (depicted in certain continuities as his adoptive son) to protect Sarah, knowing Kyle and Sarah would later conceive him. With foreknowledge from his parents, John fends off Terminator assassination attempts in the second and third films before Judgment Day. In the fourth film, John fights with the Resistance in a postapocalyptic setting after Skynet has taken over.

As the series' central plot heavily involves time travel, the story of the character is often non-linear and portrays many possible outcomes, for example Terminator 3: Rise of the Machines and television series Terminator: The Sarah Connor Chronicles continue from the ending of Terminator 2 but are depicted as taking place in alternate timelines, while Terminator Genisys (2015) revisits and changes the events of the first film. Terminator: Dark Fate also continues from the events of Terminator 2 in another alternate timeline.

=== The Terminator ===
In The Terminator, John is mentioned and is the basis of the film. The Terminator (Arnold Schwarzenegger) is attempting to kill Sarah Connor (Linda Hamilton) because the latter will be his mother, but John does not make a physical appearance. At the film's end, Sarah is shown to be pregnant with John.

=== Terminator 2: Judgment Day ===
John Connor, as portrayed by Edward Furlong in Terminator 2: Judgement Day (1991)

In his first appearance in Terminator 2: Judgment Day (a sequel to the first film), John is a 10-year-old child and a juvenile delinquent living with foster parents (Jenette Goldstein and Xander Berkeley) while Sarah Connor is in a prison hospital for the criminally insane. Though he is informed of his destiny—namely, his future conflict with Skynet—young John is skeptical of his mother's claims about his fate as humanity's leader. While in an arcade with a friend, the Model 101 (Schwarzenegger), a reprogrammed android sent by John's future self, and the T-1000 (Robert Patrick) fight over him. This starts a chase sequence where the Model 101 and John try to lose the T-1000; the event validates Sarah's warning to John about Skynet.

Later that night, Sarah puts an escape plan into action just as John and the Model 101 arrive to save her, and the three escape. John instructs the Model 101 on how to behave like a human being, teaching it sayings such as "Hasta la vista, baby!" He forms an emotional bond with the Terminator, coming to regard it as a father figure. John later helps avert Skynet's creation and assists in the destruction of Cyberdyne Systems. With the help of Skynet's creator, Miles Dyson, he breaks into a safe to retrieve the first Terminator's damaged arm and CPU, which Dyson—unaware of what it would lead to—was using to create the new technology. After Cyberdyne is destroyed and the T-1000 is melted in a steel mill, John throws the remnants of the first Terminator into the molten steel. He begs the Terminator not to destroy itself as well, despite the Terminator's warning that allowing it to continue existing creates a risk of Skynet being recreated at some future date. John ultimately bids his friend farewell with a hug, and watches as the Terminator is lowered into molten steel.

In a flash-forward at the beginning of the film, John is briefly seen as an adult played by Michael Edwards. Dalton Abbot (Linda Hamilton's real-life son) portrays the character as a toddler in a dream sequence. An alternate ending takes place in 2027, in which John is a U.S. senator and father to a daughter in a world where Skynet was never able to start its war on humanity.

=== Terminator 3: Rise of the Machines ===
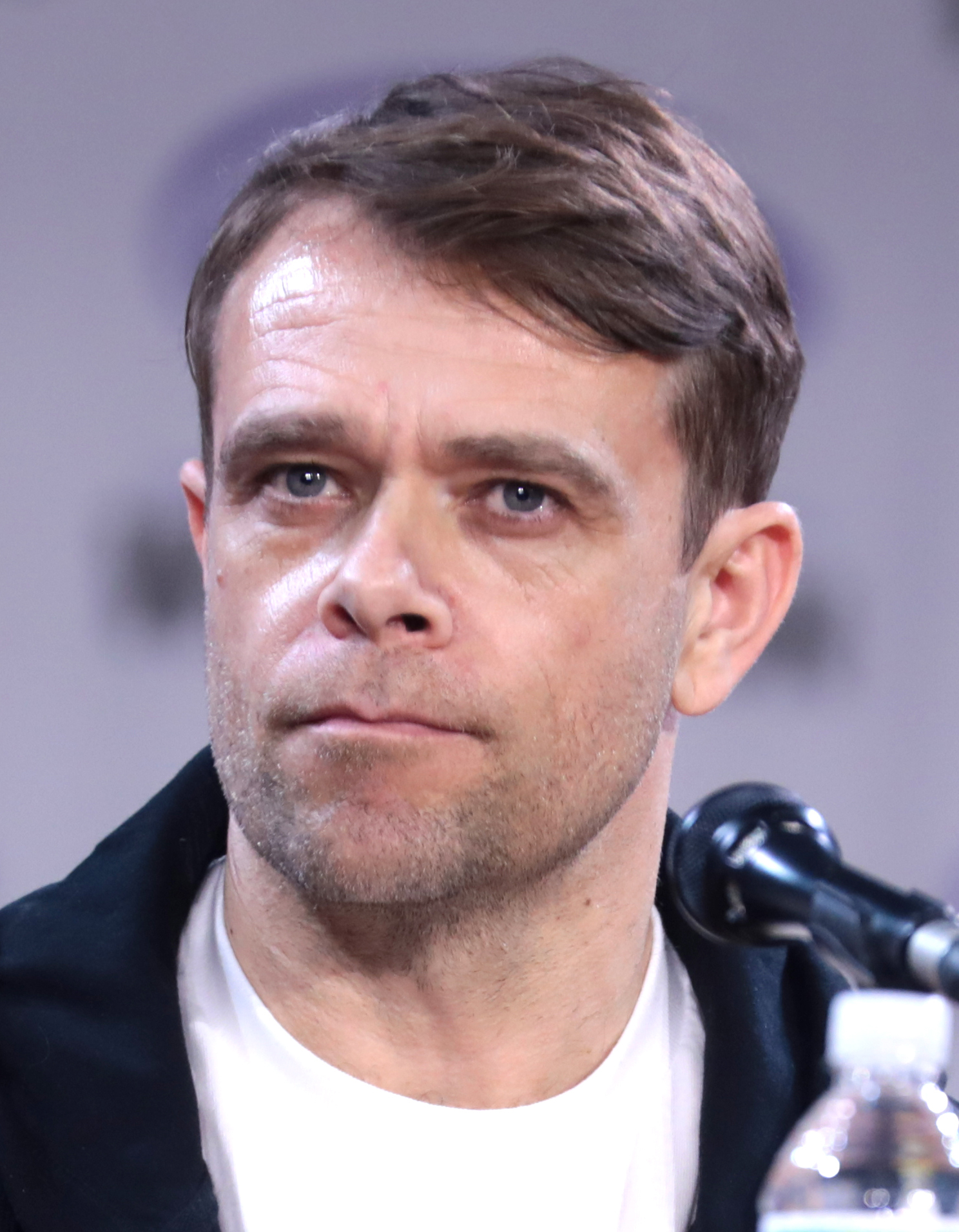
Nick Stahl (pictured in 2023) portrayed John Connor in Terminator 3: Rise of the Machines (2003).

John is portrayed by Nick Stahl in Terminator 3: Rise of the Machines (set 8 years after the second film). Now a young adult, John has been living off-the-grid since the second film's events, even as the original Judgment Day deadline in 1997 passed without incident. His mother, Sarah, eventually developed leukemia and died before the events of the film. In the film, John crosses paths with Katherine "Kate" Brewster (Claire Danes), a former classmate from when he was living with his foster parents. He is attacked by a T-X Terminator (Kristanna Loken), which was sent from the future. Unlike predecessors, the T-X's objective is to terminate his future Resistance officers as secondary targets because John's location is unknown. When the T-X encounters John, it changes its priority to focus entirely on him and Kate. Because of this Terminator being dominant and feminine, John personally coins the T-X as "Terminatrix."

A protector T-850 (Schwarzenegger), identical to John's previous defender, is also sent back in time to protect him. The Terminator explains that Judgment Day was merely delayed and is now only hours away. It adds that Kate Brewster, John’s future wife and second-in-command, sent it from the future after the same Terminator model assassinated John on July 4, 2032—a model Skynet selected because of John's emotional attachment to it. Believing his marriage to Kate was destiny, John realizes that were it not for the T-1000's disruption during his childhood, they would have grown up together. This insight deepens when Kate admits she had a crush on him during their youth. In the original timeline, this relationship would have introduced John to Kate's father, Robert Brewster. Being the true architect of Skynet—who weaponized Miles Dyson's artificial intelligence research—Brewster would have inadvertently placed John at ground zero during Skynet's original 1997 activation. Ultimately vindicating his mother's warnings, these revelations oblige John to embrace his destiny despite his reluctance. In the original timeline's post-apocalyptic future, John marries Kate, and they contact the remnants of the United States Department of Defense to form the framework of the Resistance against Skynet.

Intending to avert the apocalypse by halting Skynet's launch, John and Kate race to the Crystal Peak facility under the mistaken belief that its core is housed within. Instead, they find themselves locked safely inside a secure bunker, helpless as Skynet’s manipulations trigger the first nuclear assault on the United States. Skynet is pure software and has already spread to every server worldwide, making it impossible to shut down. It is via the radios in this bunker that John begins broadcasting messages to lay the groundwork for helping survivors and organizing the Resistance.

=== Terminator Salvation ===
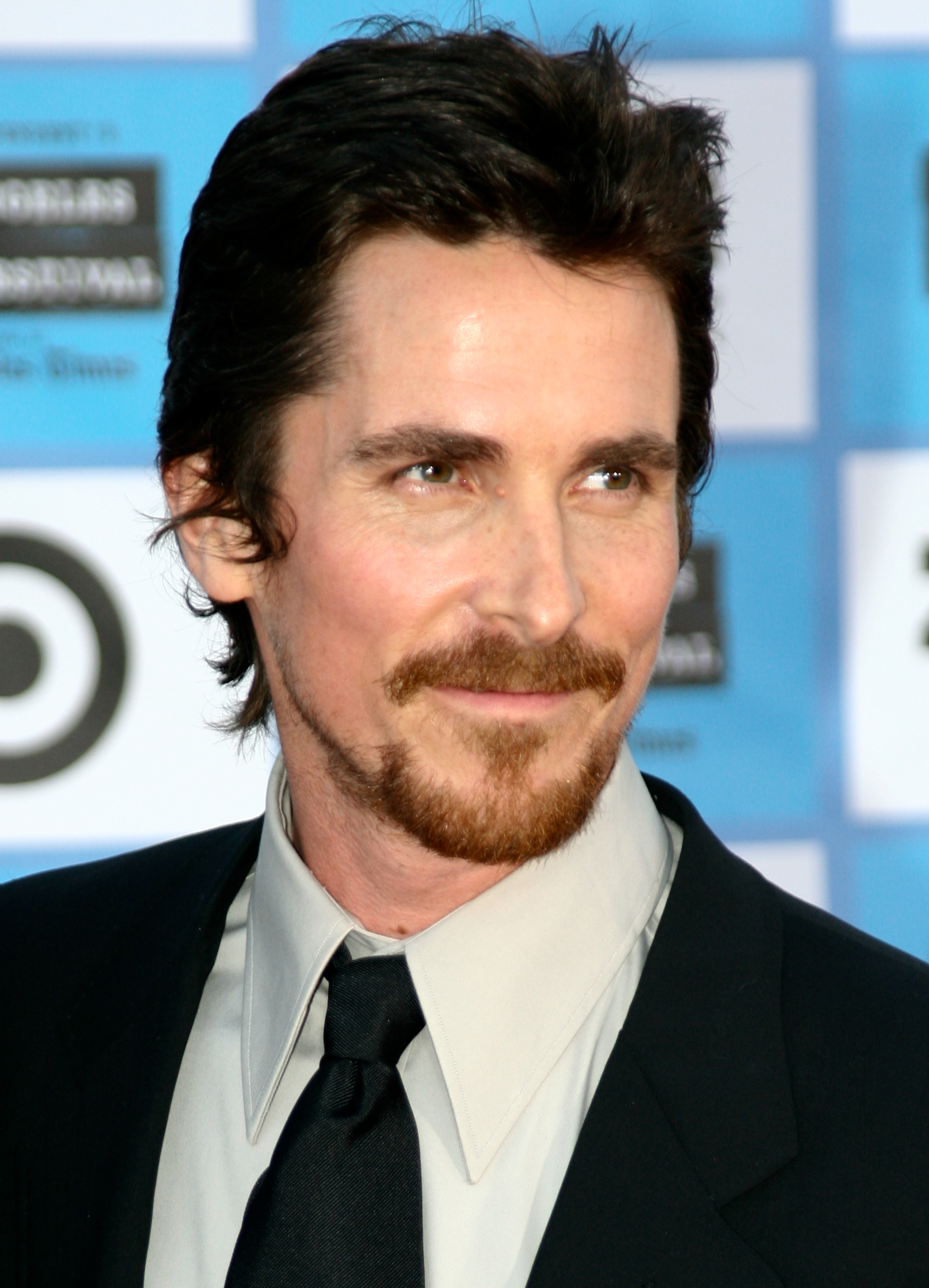
Christian Bale portrayed John Connor in Terminator Salvation (2009).

John is portrayed by Christian Bale in Terminator Salvation (which is set in 2018), now an older, battle-experienced Resistance soldier. Kate Brewster (Bryce Dallas Howard), who serves as a medic, is now pregnant with his child. Kate also assists command with her Tech-Com unit. Since Judgment Day, John has broadcast radio messages to both Resistance forces and surviving refugees to maintain morale and hope. Realizing that constant timeline shifts have made his tactical knowledge obsolete, John discovers Skynet is manufacturing T-800s ahead of schedule—a clear sign that the AI is learning from its own future. The story also features a teenage Kyle Reese (Anton Yelchin) and a new character, Marcus Wright (Sam Worthington). John starts as one of the many foot soldiers in the Resistance movement based in California.

Despite having extensive prior knowledge of the machines and Skynet's capabilities, John is largely dismissed by General Hugh Ashdown (Michael Ironside), who runs the Resistance organization, considering Connor a delusional false prophet at best and a dangerous liability to their operations at worst. Nonetheless, there are pockets of people within the Resistance who have come to believe in John's experiences and judgment based on their own firsthand experiences serving with him. In addition, the Resistance's majority is gradually losing faith in the Resistance Command due to Ashdown's ruthless and vicious tactics that cost many of his own soldiers' and civilians' lives. Toward the middle of the film, John learns that Kyle has been placed in a detention center by Skynet, which is aware of Kyle's future role as John's father, classifying Kyle as its primary target and John as its secondary objective, even over the Resistance's current leaders, and sets out to rescue Kyle, with Marcus leading him to the base. Upon arrival, John faces off with a T-800 crafted in the unit's image that he and his family have encountered previously. John is hurt during his encounter with the T-800 and receives multiple cuts to the face, mirroring the same scars seen on John's face in the opening scenes of Terminator 2: Judgment Day and Terminator 3: Rise of the Machines. Marcus helps him destroy the T-800, but John's heart is too badly damaged due to injury, and Marcus offers his own to John. In addition, after the Resistance Command is caught in Skynet's trap, John's Tech-Com unit takes over the authority with no opposition. John's ending statement is that though this battle has been won, the war is far from over.

=== Terminator Genisys ===
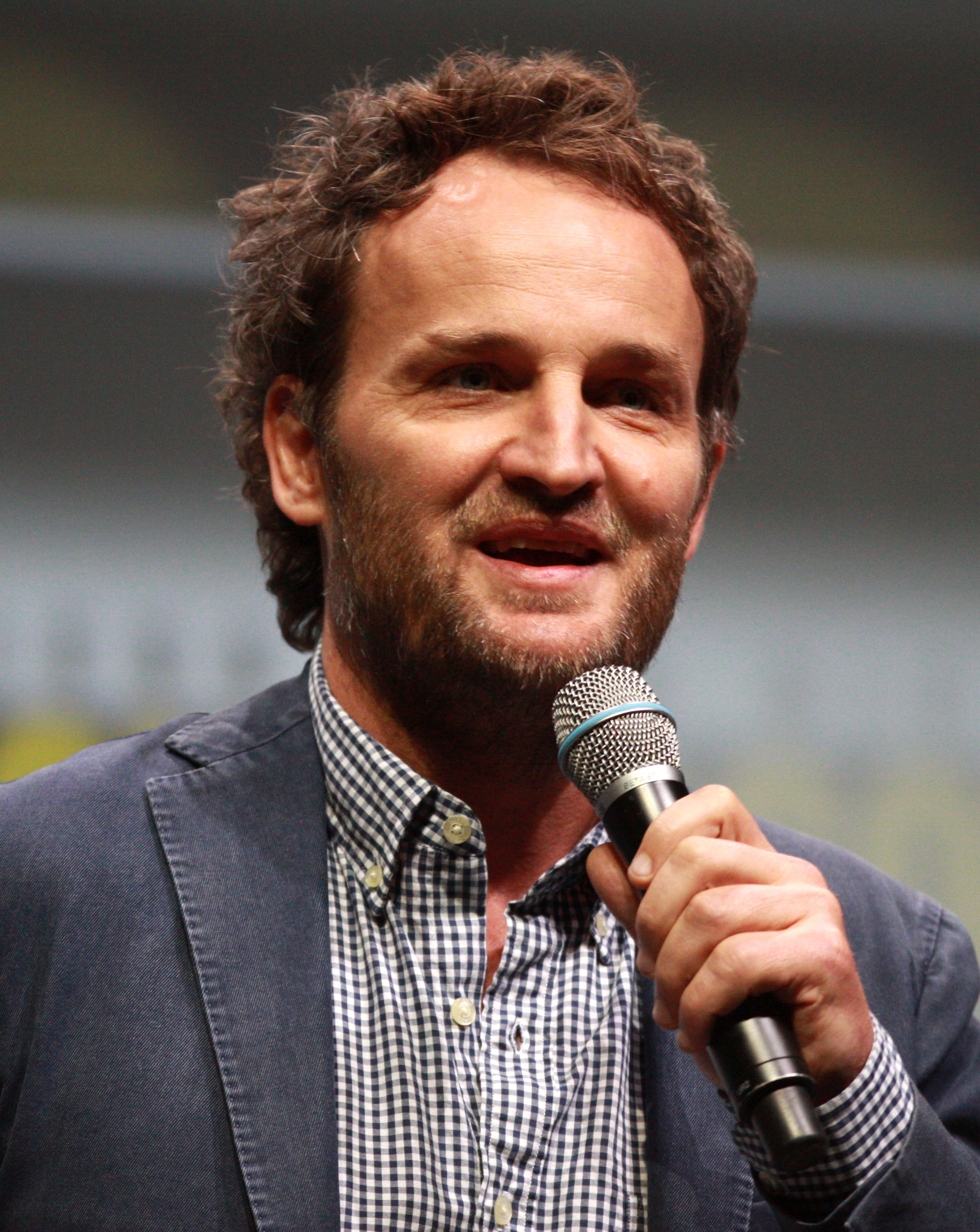
Jason Clarke (pictured in 2013) portrayed John Connor in Terminator Genisys (2015).

John is portrayed by Jason Clarke in Terminator Genisys (which alters the events of the four Terminator films that had been released prior). Following a confrontation with a T-5000 (Matt Smith) on the war's seemingly final day, just as Kyle Reese (Jai Courtney) is being sent back to save Sarah Connor (Emilia Clarke), John is forcibly transformed into the T-3000 cyborg as a result of a Skynet program to use nanites to convert living flesh into machine matter. Although all other recorded test subjects for this process were left irreversibly insane and then died during the transformation, John came through the process reasonably intact, albeit now a sociopath dedicated to ensuring Skynet's rise at humanity's cost.

Skynet then sends the T-3000 back in time to ensure its creation in the altered timeline, John now believing that the future requires man and machine to come together like he has. He travels back in time to 2014 and joins Cyberdyne Systems to help create a new version of Skynet, working with Miles Dyson and Danny Dyson to perfect development of the new Genisys system, turning Skynet into a massive digital network rather than a single computer system. Three years later, despite his superior physical strength, he was destroyed by "Pops" (Schwarzenegger), a T-800 reprogrammed and sent into the past by an unknown party to protect Sarah, when both of them were trapped inside a prototype time machine. With the machine just capable of generating the electromagnetic energy that prevented non-living tissue travelling through time without actually generating a temporal portal, Connor is ripped apart while trapped at the heart of the machine after earlier battle-damage disrupted his ability to maintain his organic shell. It is ambiguous as to whether a version of the character will exist in the altered timeline, with John himself stating that his existence is a paradox that is no longer tied to Sarah and Kyle conceiving him.

=== Terminator: Dark Fate ===
John appears briefly in Terminator: Dark Fate, which serves as a direct sequel to Terminator 2: Judgment Day, portrayed by Jude Collie with CGI facial capture performed by Furlong, ignoring previous sequels without creator James Cameron's involvement. In the opening scene, set three years after the events of Judgment Day, it is revealed that even though Skynet was erased from existence with Cyberdyne's destruction, it had sent multiple Terminators back to different points in time to kill John. He and Sarah are found in Guatemala by a T-800, which then shoots John dead in front of Sarah.

Though dead and gone, John's legacy continues to play a crucial role in the story. In the following years, with its mission fulfilled and Skynet no longer existing to give orders, the same T-800 develops a form of conscience and takes the name "Carl". It atones for John's death by sending Sarah encrypted messages revealing the location of Skynet's future arriving Terminators, while Sarah takes it upon herself to track down and destroy them to avenge John and ensure that their technology will not be used to rebuild Skynet and John's sacrifice will not be in vain. Carl later joins the fight against the Rev-9, a Terminator built by a new A.I. known as Legion. The Rev-9 is sent from the future to kill Daniella "Dani" Ramos, who will take John's place as the future leader of the human resistance against machines. In the future, Dani tells her army, "There is no fate but what we make for ourselves," as John said to Kyle Reese before sending him back to 1984. As Carl and the Rev-9 are destroyed, Carl's final words to Sarah are "for John", therefore atoning for John's death by sacrificing itself. Like she did with John, Sarah plans to prepare Dani for the coming battles against Legion, explaining her similar role and quotes to John's in the future.

== Terminator: The Sarah Connor Chronicles ==
John Connor
- Terminator: The Sarah Connor Chronicles character
- First appearance: "Pilot" (2008)
- Last appearance: "Born to Run" (2009)
- Based on: John Connor by: James Cameron; Gale Anne Hurd; William Wisher Jr.
- Adapted by: Josh Friedman
- Portrayed by: Thomas Dekker; John De Vito (child)

In-universe information
- Aliases: John Reese; John Baum
- Occupation: High school student
- Family: Cameron (guardian, confidant)
- Significant other: Riley Dawson

Thomas Dekker portrays John Connor in the parallel universe television series Terminator: The Sarah Connor Chronicles. He is fifteen years old at the beginning of the series, turning sixteen in the season one finale, and seventeen throughout season two. As the series progresses, John struggles with his feelings for the Terminator Cameron. John De Vito portrays a young John in the episodes "Queen's Gambit" and "To the Lighthouse".

=== Casting and production background ===
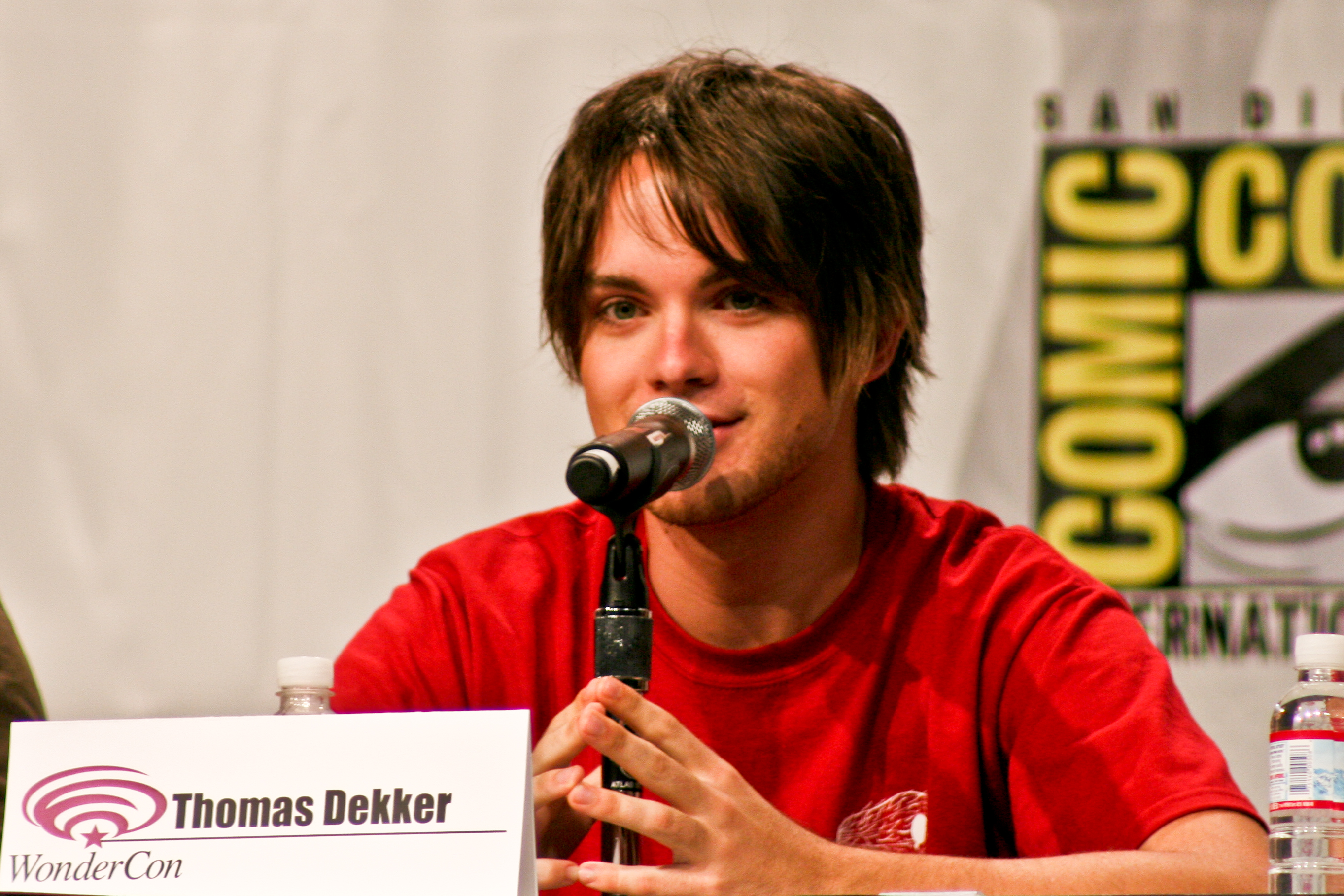
Thomas Dekker portrayed John Connor in Terminator: The Sarah Connor Chronicles (2008–2009).

Dekker was cast after Lena Headey secured the role of Sarah Connor. Regarding the Terminator films, Dekker says "They are like my favorite films when I was younger. So it's very ironic that I'm getting to do this. And I know for the younger generation and for myself, John was equally important to me as Sarah was, and I know a lot of the people that I hear from really, really care about John". Dekker described his character as "a continuation of Eddie Furlong's character" but "he's in a darker, more mature place now".

The show tells the story of the Connors in an alternate timeline from Terminator 3: Rise of the Machines. It branches off from the shared back story of Terminator 2, and according to consulting producer James Middleton, it was a new "version of T3."

=== Premise ===
At the beginning of the series in 1999, John and Sarah try to settle down to normal lives after the events of the second film, but they are in fear of being captured for blowing up Cyberdyne. While at school, John is attacked by a Terminator posing as a teacher, and is protected by a reprogrammed Terminator named "Cameron". John learns that Judgment Day has not been prevented, only postponed to April 21, 2011. John does not want to run anymore and asks Sarah to stop Skynet from being created. Cameron uses time dilation technology (built by "The Engineer" from the future) to send all three of them to 2007, just before Skynet is created, so that they can stop it.

Settling down in 2007, John enrolls in Campo de Cahuenga High School under the name of John Baum, after author L. Frank Baum who wrote The Wonderful Wizard of Oz, a book that Sarah says was John's favorite when he was younger, where he is friends with his fellow students Morris and Riley Dawson. He becomes acquainted with his father's older brother, Derek Reese, who is also a resistance fighter sent back in time to help them. This version of John is shown to be a highly skilled computer hacker (a nod from Terminator 2), even being able to hack into a Terminator's CPU in order to read the information it contains, as well as easily hacking into the LAPD database. He claims that he could hack a computer system 'in (his) sleep'. He is also proficient in chess, lock-picking, self-defense, and weaponry, all of which were part of his training during his childhood.

The relationship dynamic between John and Cameron differs from that with the Model 101 seen in the second film by virtue of her size/gender, with some degree of sexual tension. He also develops a relationship with Riley Dawson, a high school classmate, who, unknown to him, is also from the future and working with Jesse Flores, a resistance fighter and lover of Derek Reese. Jesse's plan was for John to become infatuated with Riley, making her a threat to John's security. This would force Cameron to kill Riley, thereby alienating John from her. Apparently, after Judgment Day, rumors abound of an unnatural relationship between the two that affects John's tactical decision making, and some are unsettled that he has appointed a Terminator as one of his lieutenants.

== Literature ==
=== T2 trilogy ===
The T2 novel trilogy explores Sarah and John's life while living off-the-grid. The first novel, T2: Infiltrator, is set six years after the events of Terminator 2: Judgment Day. It sees Sarah and 16-year-old John live a relatively normal life under the assumed names Suzanne and John Krieger, near a small town in Paraguay. They own a successful trucking company and are proficient smugglers. John also attends military school, quickly becoming one of their best students, gaining military skills, weaponry and hacking knowledge. The Connors believed that they had destroyed Cyberdyne Systems for good and prevented the creation of Skynet, until a new T-800 is sent to kill them. To stop Skynet's creation, the Connors team up with their new neighbor Dieter von Rossbach, a former Austrian counterterrorism operative and future model for the T-800 series. They also join forces with FBI agent Jordan Dyson, the brother of Miles Dyson. They ultimately realise that Cyberdyne was able to gain new research data from the salvaged arm of "Uncle Bob", which was lost in the battle with the T-1000 and left trapped in the gears of the manufacturing plant. The group destroys Cyberdyne's most recent facility and the remaining Terminators, although Sarah is wounded by a new Terminator model, the i-950 Infiltrator, who had sent the T-800.

The following novel, T2: Rising Storm, shows John and Dieter starting up the foundations of the future Resistance a few months after the events of the previous novel. Dieter has been chosen as John's guardian by Sarah while she recovers from her wounds. Dieter, John, and John's new girlfriend, Wendy Dorset, head to a Cyberdyne back-up facility in Montana but they fail to stop Skynet from becoming sentient. Wendy is killed by an i-950, and Skynet begins eradicating humanity after John accidentally uploads a command protocol to make Skynet sentient (Wendy had completed a program to erase Skynet before her death but John uploaded the wrong file at the last minute).

In the final novel, T2: The Future War, Skynet has killed three billion people and John has become the leader of the Resistance, with Sarah and Dieter having fallen in love and married. The life between the parents of John's eventual father Kyle Reese is explored, with Kyle being born, being captured by a patrol unit as a child and forced to work in a Skynet work camp. The work camp is liberated by John and his Tech-Com unit, freeing Kyle and the other prisoners, while Kyle's parents are killed. John assigns his friend Jack Brock to protect Kyle, as well as becoming his foster father. Kyle grows up fighting alongside John and his Tech-Com unit. In 2029, as the Resistance is about to destroy Skynet's defence grid, Skynet makes a last effort to win the war by sending several Terminators back in time to kill the Connors. Once John finds out about this, he sends the volunteering Kyle back to protect Sarah from the T-800 and a reprogrammed T-800 to protect his younger self from the T-1000. Afterwards, Skynet is effectively destroyed and John is greeted by Sarah, Dieter and the remaining Resistance members as they are relieved that the great ordeal is finally over.

=== Comic books ===
John Connor appears in the non-canon Terminator/Superman comic book crossover Superman vs. The Terminator: Death to the Future, in which he and Sarah Connor team up with Superman against Skynet and Cyborg Superman. While Superboy and Supergirl protect the young John in the present, Superman is pulled into the future and assists the adult John and Steel in defeating Skynet for good.

== Other appearances ==
=== Video games ===
John Connor appears in the video game Terminator Salvation, set two years before the events of the film. In 2016, John (voiced by Gideon Emery) and Blair Williams (Moon Bloodgood) are on a mission to rescue David Weston (Sean Cory Cooper), until they team up with Angie Salter (Rose McGowan) and Barnes (Common) to fight the machines.

John also appears in the video game Terminator: Resistance, set during the original future war depicted in the first two Terminator films. He is voiced by Eric Meyers and serves as the player character, Jacob Rivers's commanding officer within the Tech-Com Resistance group. John makes a physical appearance towards the endgame where he briefs and debriefs Jacob during the final assault on Skynet's base.

=== Attraction ===
Furlong reprised his role from Terminator 2 in the Universal Studios attraction T2-3D: Battle Across Time, in which he and a T-800 attempt to stop Judgment Day. They travel to the future and infiltrate Cyberdyne to prevent the completion of Skynet. After fighting various machines and succeeding in their mission, John is sent back to the present.
