= Michael Edwards (actor) =

American actor and model

- Born: John Chalmers Edwards Jr. September 16, 1944 (age 82); Hialeah, Florida, U.S.
- Occupations: Actor; model
- Years active: 1972–present
- Spouse: Grace Ward (m. 1966; div. 1968)
- Children: 1

John Chalmers Edwards Jr. (born September 16, 1944), known professionally as Michael Edwards, is an American actor and model.

== Early life ==
Edwards is the son of John Chalmers Edwards Sr. and Charlotte Caroline Anderson, a high school teacher. He has an older sister named Jeannie. Shortly after his birth, the family moved to Pensacola, Florida. When he was six months old, his father left the family for a "buxom blonde Texas heiress".

== Career ==
In 1962, Edwards enlisted in the U.S. Marine Corps and received his training at Parris Island. After his discharge from the service, he began his career as a model, appearing in TV commercials and magazine layouts. While modeling, he had a dialogue-free cameo in Play It as It Lays (1972) opposite Tuesday Weld. Edwards is pictured and interviewed in the book Male Model: The World Behind the Camera, published in 1979.

Edwards' most prominent acting role was as Joan Crawford's lover Ted Gelber in the 1981 film Mommie Dearest with Faye Dunaway and Mara Hobel. He appeared briefly as "General John Connor" in Terminator 2: Judgment Day (1991).

== Personal life ==
On June 4, 1966, Edwards married flight attendant Grace Ward, of Boston. They had a daughter. Edwards and Ward divorced in October 1968. Edwards had an affair with actress Merle Oberon, who was 33 years older and at that time married to Bruno Pagliai.

=== Sexual abuse allegations ===
Edwards dated Priscilla Presley on and off between 1978 and 1984. After they broke up, he wrote a book titled Priscilla, Elvis, and Me (1988), in which he admitted being attracted to Presley's teenage daughter Lisa Marie. Lisa Marie reported in a 2003 interview with Playboy that Edwards would make drunken attempts to enter her room and be "inappropriate" with her. In 2024, these claims were restated in more graphic detail in Presley's posthumous memoir, From Here to the Great Unknown, with Lisa Marie claiming that he molested her.

== Filmography ==
Year	Title	Role	Notes
1972	Play It as It Lays	Rick Lacy	Uncredited
1981	Mommie Dearest	Ted Gelber	
1991	Terminator 2: Judgment Day	General John Connor	
2021	Skynet	General John Connor	Fan film

== Bibliography ==
- Edwards, Michael (1988). Priscilla, Elvis, and Me. St. Martin's Press. ISBN 9780312022686.
