= Takashi Nagasako =

Japanese voice actor (born 1964)

- 長嶝 高士
- Born: February 24, 1964 (age 62); Wakayama Prefecture, Japan
- Occupation: Voice actor
- Agent: Arts Vision
- Notable work: The Legend of Zelda as Ganondorf/Ganon; Donkey Kong and Mario as Donkey Kong; Hōzuki no Reitetsu as King Yama; Dragon Ball as Dodoria; Marvel vs. Capcom as Captain Commando; One Piece as Jozu; Bleach as Ushōda Hachigen; Soulcalibur as Rock Adams and Cervantes de Leon; Street Fighter as Darun Mister; Sonic the Hedgehog as Big the Cat

Takashi Nagasako (長嶝 高士, Nagasako Takashi; born February 24, 1964) is a Japanese voice actor who is currently affiliated with Arts Vision. He has voiced in a number of video games with roles such as Ganondorf in The Legend of Zelda, Big the Cat in the Sonic the Hedgehog series, Cervantes de Leon and Rock Adams in Soulcalibur, Gale Lantis in Soul Link, Donkey Kong in the Donkey Kong and Super Mario series and Darun Mister in Street Fighter EX. In anime, he voices King Yama in Hōzuki no Reitetsu. He has taken over some of the roles from the late Shun Yashiro, Junpei Takiguchi, Masaaki Tsukada, and Tōru Ōhira.

== Filmography ==
=== Anime ===
Year	Series	Role	Notes	Source
1992	Crayon Shin-chan	Various characters		
1993	Nintama Rantaro	Raiki, Yukie, Atsuru Atsuro	Eps. 9, 5-10, 13	
1993	Jungle King Tar-chan	Gyoten Ningen		
1994	Tico of the Seven Seas	Brad		
1994	Brave Police J-Decker	Weather forecaster		
1994	Ginga Sengoku Gun'yūden Rai	Kakouga		
1994	Macross 7	Docker		
1994	Phantom Quest Corp.	Aides 側近	OVA ep. 3	
1995	Gatchaman	UN Military Operator	OVA vol. 2	
1995	Tenchi Universe	Captain Dameishi, Courtiers		
1995	Juuni Senshi Bakuretsu Eto Ranger	Pakaracchi, Roran		
1995	Bonobono	Bonobono's father		
1995	Neon Genesis Evangelion	Various characters		
1996	Famous Dog Lassie	Kevin ケビン		
1996	Brave Command Dagwon	Gedo		
1996	MD Geist	A guitar ギスタ	OVA	
1996	Midori no Makibaō	Beanaccle		
1996	Birdy the Mighty	Teacher	OVA ep. 1	
1996	You're Under Arrest	Suspicious man 怪しい男		
1997	The King of Braves GaoGaiGar	Chairman		
1997	Maze	Bossman		
1997	Vampire Princess Miyu	Shinma		
1998	AWOL - Absent Without Leave	Operator		
1998	Tekken: The Motion Picture	Ganryu	OVA ep. 2	
1998	Trigun	Various characters		
1998	Cowboy Bebop	George		
1998	Grander Musashi RV	Kaneda sky 姜太空		
1998	Yu-Gi-Oh!	Captain		
1998	Marvelous Melmo	Matsuya	reboot version	
1998	Popolocrois	Sanda		
1998	Generator Gawl	Manager		
1998	Steam Detectives	Yagami, Howard		
1999	Microman	shell シェル		
1999	To Heart	History teacher		
1999	Gokudo the Adventurer	Ah		
1999	Shin Hakkenden	Gokumon		
1999	Corrector Yui	Q		
1999	Magic User's Club	Homeroom teacher		
1999	Cyborg Kuro-chan	Gurnee ガーニー		
1999	Jibaku-kun	Merchant		
1999	Seraphim Call	Deputy commander, Staff	Eps. 1, 5	
1999	Excel Saga	Pedro, Owner		
1999	Karakurizōshi Ayatsuri Sakon	Chutaita Maima 式馬忠太		
1999	The Big O	Cleaning staff		
1999	Shukan Storyland	Father of defense 守の父		
1999	Wild Arms: Twilight Venom	Man		
2000	Miami Guns	Joke, Jordan, Dave		
2000	Heroro-kun	Demon		
2000	Platinumhugen Ordian	Darryl		
2000	Professor Fabre is a famous detective	Mailman		
2000	Brigadoon: Marin & Melan	Principal, others		
2000	Descendants of Darkness	Yuki Oki 邑輝雪貴		
2000	Hajime no Ippo	Jim Nishikawa's trainer, Angler		
2000	Gear Fighter Dendoh	Aldebaran アルデバラン		
2000	Argento Soma	High official 高官		
2001	Salaryman Kintaro	Shingo Hitotsubashi 一ツ橋伸吾		
2001	Z.O.E. Dolores, I	Operator		
2001	Gyōten Ningen Batseelor	Bokutorugai / Doctor Guy ドクトル・ガイ		
2001	Shingu: Secret of the Stellar Wars	Veloch ヴェロッシュ		
2001	Parappa the Rapper	Bobby-Sensei	Ep. 22, 26	
2001	Babel II	Man		
2001	Kirby of the Stars	Palm, Curio, Mayor, others		
2001	Hikaru no Go	Deke-san		
2001	Vampiyan Kids	Miere ミエール		
2002	Ultimate Muscle	Nosonman		
2001	Comic Party	Yoko		
2002	Tokyo Mew Mew	Judge		
2002	Forza! Hidemaru	Riki		
2002	Digimon Frontier	Trailmon (worm) トレイルモン（ワーム）		
2002	New Atashin'chi	Art teacher		
2002	Saikano	Soldier		
2002	Demon Lord Dante	Shea		
2002	Monkey Typhoon	Clown ピエロ		
2002	Naruto	Yashiro Uchiha		
2002	Tsuribaka Nisshi	President Doi 土井頭取		
2003	Mouse	Heitarou Onizuka		
2003	Wolf's Rain	Retriever 奪還隊		
2003	Crush Gear Nitro	Sone river 曽根川		
2003	Beast Fighter - The Apocalpyse	James Sanders		
2003	Kaleido Star	Investor		
2003	Tank Knights Fortress	Mayor 市長		
2003	Sonic X	Big the Cat		
2003	Ninja Scroll: The Series	Ronin		
2003	Gad Guard	Master of an orchard 果樹園の主人		
2003	Cinderella Boy	Boyle ボイル		
2003	Yami to Bōshi to Hon no Tabibito	Buran, Conductor, Kansuke Yatsushiro		
2003	PoPoLoCrois	Goulie グーリー		
2003	F-Zero: GP Legend	Gomers ゴマー		
2003	Bobobo-bo Bo-bobo	Kabeo 壁男		
2004	SD Gundam Force	Zakrello Gate, Leonardo, Captain Bone Lee, Zako Soldier		
2004	Area 88	Randy		
2004	Kita e	Uraoka		
2004	Kaiketsu Zorori	King		
2004	Mars Daybreak	Carb Dolittle カルブ・ドリトル		
2004	Sgt. Frog	Julie ジュリー人		
2004	Burst Angel	Child		
2004	Melody of Oblivion	Manger		
2004	Ragnarok the Animation	Knight, Golden Bull		
2004–2006	Ultimate Muscle II	Wash Ass, Nosonman	2 seasons	
2004	Samurai Champloo	Kazeha		
2004–2005	Girls Bravo	Vegetable Store Keeper	2 seasons	
2004	Galaxy Angel X	Professor		
2004	Onmyō Taisenki	Various characters		
2004	My-Hime	Member		
2004	Viewtiful Joe	Bomb Detective, Agent B		
2004	Samurai Gun	Yui military diameter 由井軍径		
2004	Bleach	Various characters		
2004	Black Jack	Tinck's father, Carreras		
2004	Yakitate!! Japan	Haruo Mizuno		
2005	Air	Teacher		
2005	Gallery Fake	Ant		
2005	Pandalian	Silver, Max		
2005	Majime ni Fumajime: Kaiketsu Zorori	Middle-aged man 中年男		
2005	Comic Party Revolution	Tachikawa Yuzo, Yoko Man 立川雄蔵/よこ男		
2005	The Law of Ueki	Heavenly Beast / Tenko (Large) 天界獣/テンコ（大）		
2005	Glass Mask	Saotome		
2005	Gun × Sword	Deputy captain 副艦長		
2005	Akahori Gedou Hour Rabuge	Semi man セミ男		
2005	Rockman EXE Beast	Zoan Flameman		
2005	Hell Girl	Minoru Higuchi		
2005	Beet the Vandel Buster	Raymond		
2005	Blood+	Lewis		
2005	Lamune	Kenryuu Tomosaka		
2006	Ah My Buddha	Moderator 司会の僧侶		
2006	Wan Wan Celeb Soreyuke! Tetsunoshin	Chin, Golgo		
2006	Ouran High School Host Club	A crowded brother 舎弟		
2006	Gintama	Namba 難波		
2006	Soul Link	Gale Lantis		
2006	Inukami!	Man		
2006	Tama & Friends Search! Magical Punipni Stone	King		
2006	Powerpuff Girls Z	Oya Monster おやじモンスター		
2006	Night Head Genesis	Big brother		
2006	La Corda d'Oro	Judge		
2006	Tokimeki Memorial Only Love	Kyohei Dojima		
2006	Pumpkin Scissors	Walter		
2006	D.Gray-man	ice		
2006	Fist of the Blue Sky	1st Star		
2006	009-1	Official		
2006	Kenichi: The Mightiest Disciple	Gonzui Kumatori		
2006	Hataraki Man	Makoto Chiba 千葉真		
2007	Naruto Shippuden	Yashiro うちはヤシロ		
2007	GeGeGe no Kitaro	Yoshinaga, Mikoshi-Nyuudou	series 5	
2007	Robby & Kerobby	Various characters		
2007	Kotetsushin Jeeg	Naojiro		
2007	Kaze no Stigma	Terrorist テロリスト		
2007	Emma – A Victorian Romance: Second Act	Baron Wardle ウォードル男爵		
2007	Miyori no Mori	Fukuurin フークーリン		
2007	Moonlight Mile 2nd season -Touch down-	Bob McIntire ボブ・マッキンタイア		
2007	Bamboo Blade	Sakaguchi		
2008	Dazzle	Liszfeld リィズフェルト		
2008	Major	Aguilera アギレラ	4th series	
2008	Porphy no Nagai Tabi	Elder husband, uncle 初老の夫/おじさん		
2008	Noramimi	Mars マルス		
2008	Itazura na Kiss	Shigeki Irie		
2008	Monochrome Factor	Employee		
2008	Golgo 13	Jake, Smith		
2008	Nijū Mensō no Musume	Awesome 暴漢		
2008	Battle Spirits: Shounen Toppa Bashin	Buddhist Priest		
2008	Inazuma Eleven	Hirona Tonaka Principal		
2008	Tytania	Mayor		
2008	Michiko and Hatchin	Jose ホセ		
2009	Examurai Sengoku	Beard bear ヒゲ熊		
2009	Sora o Miageru Shōjo no Hitomi ni Utsuru Sekai	Minister 大臣		
2009	Dragon Ball Kai	Dodoria		
2009	Kon'nichiwa Anne: Before Green Gables	Kendrick Hammond		
2009	Saki	Ramen shop owner ラーメン屋店主		
2009	Sōten Kōro	Perforation 孔伷		
2009	The story of a girl with a blue eyes	Okuma 大熊		
2009	Jungle Emperor Leo: The Brave Change The Future	Squirrel		
2009	Inuyasha: The Final Act	Demon		
2009	Miracle Train: Ōedo-sen e Yōkoso			
2009	Sister Brothers ご姉弟物語	Kozo Machida 町田耕造		
2009	Kiddy Girl-and	Bronco		
2010	Heroman	Policeman 警官		
2010	SD Gundam Sangokuden Brave Battle Warriors	Sonken Zephyranthes		
2010	Shimajirō Hesoka	Shimajiro's grandfather しまじろうのおじいさん	Ep. 21, Ep. 40, Ep. 70	
2010–2011	Tono to Issho series	Shin Gen Takeda / Chosakubo Okabe 武田信玄/長宗我部国親; Uesugi Scenic 上杉景勝		
2010	Digimon Xros Wars	Mu Shamon ムシャモン		
2010	Asobi ni Iku yo!	Kantoku Kawasaki		
2011	Nichijou	Professor Tomioka		
2011	Sket Dance	Four heavenly kings 四天王		
2011	Yondemasuyo, Azazel-san	Yakuza Boss		
2011	Rinshi!! Ekoda-chan	Narrator, Hosotani ナレーション/細谷		
2011	Tamayura: Hitotose	Old age 老夫		
2012	Black Rock Shooter	Head teacher		
2012	Saint Seiya Ω	Enade エネアド		
2012	Sengoku Collection	Mr. Hirai 平井警部		
2012	Transformers: Prime	Bulkhead バルクヘッド		
2012	JoJo's Bizarre Adventure	Policeman 警部		
2013	Free	Male teacher 男性教師		
2014	Saki: The Nationals	Ramen shop owner		
2014	Hozuki's Coolheadedness	King Yama		
2014	Notari Matsutarō	A referee 審判		
2014	Free! -Eternal Summer-	Living instruction teacher 生活指導教諭		
2017	Konosuba	Aldarp アルダープ	season 2	
2023–present	Bleach: Thousand-Year Blood War	Hachigen Ushōda 有昭田 鉢玄		
2026	Nippon Sangoku	Denki Taira 平殿器		

=== Film ===
Year	Title	Role	Notes	Source
1995	Ninku: The Movie	Fake indigo ニセ藍朓		
1995	Memories	Station announcer	Ep. 3 "City of Cannon"	
1999	The Doraemons: Funny Candy of Okashinana!?	Koga Robo コゲロボ		
1999	Crayon Shin-chan: Explosion! The Hot Spring's Feel Good Final Battle	Prime Minister 内閣総理大臣		
1999	Cyberteam in Akihabara: Summer Vacation of 2011	Sparrow's father すずめの父		
2000	Doki Doki Wildcat Engine	Athimov's subordinate アチモフの部下		
2000	Case Closed: Captured in Her Eyes	Nakano 中野		
2001	Princess Arete	King 王様		
2002	A Tree of Palme	Bug バク		
2002	Case Closed: The Phantom of Baker Street	Venue staff 会場スタッフ		
2003	Pa-Pa-Pa the Movie: Perman	Mr. Oyama 大山先生		
2004	Crayon Shin-chan: The Storm Called: The Kasukabe Boys of the Evening Sun	Okegawa オケガワ		
2007	Crayon Shin-chan: The Storm Called: The Singing Buttocks Bomb	Members 隊員		
2009	Pyu to Fuku! Jaguar: The Movie	John Taio ジョン太夫		
2010	Doraemon: Nobita's Great Battle of the Mermaid King	Soldier		
2011	Dragon Ball: Episode of Bardock	Dodoria		

=== Video games ===
Year	Title	Role	Notes	Source
1994	Graduation photo / Miki Hime	Takanikawa Tsuneki, Suematsu Kaji 多喜川巧/末松乾次	Other	
1995	Konpeki no Kantai	Genichiro Higashino 東野源一郎	Other	
1996–1997	Arc the Lad games	Guruga, Gene	PS1 / PS2	
1996	Street Fighter EX	Darun Mister	arcade	
1996	Mega Man/Rockman 8	Tengu Man, Search Man	PS1 / Sega Saturn	
1996	Soul Edge	Cervantes de Leon, Nathaniel "Rock" Adams		
1997	Street Fighter EX Plus α	Darun Mister	PS1 / PS2	
1997	Mega Man/Rockman X4	Magma Dragoon, Slash Beast	PS1 / Sega Saturn	
1997	Mobile Suit Zeta Gundam	Shisa シーサー	PS1 / PS2	
1998	Dragon Force II: Kamisarishi Daichi ni	Enzo エンツォ	SS	
1998	Cooking Fighter Hao	Taste the four heavenly prince 味四天王ハッカク	PS1 / PS2	
1998	JoJo's Bizarre Adventure: Heritage For The Future	Khan カーン	Arcade, PlayStation, Dreamcast	
1998–1999	Rival Schools: United by Fate	Boman Delgado, Gan Isurugi	Arcade, PlayStation	
1998–1999	Soulcalibur	Rock Adams, Cervantes de Leon	Arcade, Dreamcast	
1998	Legend of Legaia	Songi	PS1 / PS2	
1998	The Legend of Zelda: Ocarina of Time	Ganondorf, Talon, Ingo	Nintendo 64	
1998	Étude Prologue: Yureugoku Kokoro no Katachi	Hana Hanata 1 / Tatsuya's father 花吹太一/達也の父親	SS	
1998	Fighting Eyes	Rick · Viper / Shark · Pirates リック・バイパー/シャーク・パイレーツ	PS1 / PS2	
1998	Rhapsody: A Musical Adventure	Hummer ハマー	PS1 / PS2	
1999	Ace Combat 3: Electrosphere	UPEO Operations Manager; UPEO作戦部長	PS1 / PS2	
1999	Comic Party	Tachikawa Yuzo, Yoko Man 立川雄蔵/よこ男	PC Adult	
1999	Shiritsu Justice Gakuen: Nekketsu Seisyun Nikki 2	Bowman Delgado / Ishikari Rock ボーマン・デルガド/石動岩	PS1 / PS2	
1999	Persona 2: Innocent Sin	Principal Hanya 反谷孝志	PS1 / PS2	
1999	Little Princess: Marl Ōkoku no Ningyō Hime 2	Geo · zeolite / Berg / Hammer ジオ・ゼオライト/バーグ/ハマー	PS1 / PS2	
1999	Street Fighter EX2 Plus	Darun Mister	PS1 / PS2	
2000	PoPoLoCrois Story II	Suhl ズール	PlayStation	
2000	Project Justice	Bowman Delgado / Ishikari Rock ボーマン・デルガド/石動岩	DC	
2000	Blood: The Last Vampire	Mama ママ	PS1 / PS2	
2000	Tenshi no Present: Marl Ōkoku Monogatari	Hammer / Berg / Geo / Zolparev / Minister ハマー/バーグ/ジオ/ゾルパレフ/大臣	PS1 / PS2	
2001	Klonoa 2: Lunatea's Veil	Leptio レプティオ	PS2	
2001	Shadow Hearts	Father Eliot エリオット神父	PS1 / PS2	
2001	Comic Party	Tachikawa Yuzo / Yoko Man 立川雄蔵/よこ男	DC	
2001	EVE TFA	blade ブレード	PS1 / PS2	
2001	Super Smash Bros. Melee	Ganondorf	Nintendo GameCube	
2002	La Pucelle: Tactics	Father Salad サラド神父	PS1 / PS2	
2002	Tales of Destiny 2	Subnock · Dantalion サブノック・ダンタリオン	PS1 / PS2	
2002	Shinobi	Kimono 金剛	PS1 / PS2	
2002	The Legend of Zelda: The Wind Waker	Ganondorf		
2002	Hikaru no Go ~ Graduation student summit decisive battle ~	Customer (glasses) 客（眼鏡）	PS1 / PS2	
2003	Sly Cooper	Murray	PS1 / PS2	
2003	Bobobo-bo Bo-bobo Hajike Matsuri	Tokoro Tennosuke	PS1 / PS2	
2003	Soulcalibur 2	Cervantes	PS1 / PS2	
2003	Marl Jong!!	Hummer ハマー	PS1 / PS2	
2003	Comic Party DCE	Tachikawa Yuzo / Yoko Man 立川雄蔵/よこ男	PC	
2003–present	Sonic the Hedgehog series	Big the Cat		
2004	Phantom Brave	Sprout, Shishokab	PS2	
2004	Shikigami no Shiro II	Phi Eija ファイ・エイジャ	PS1 / PS2	
2004	Popolocrois ~ Adventure of the Law of the Moon ~	Donovan ドノバン	PS1 / PS2	
2004	Reincarnation School Animals	Takeshiin Ding / Masochi 宝蔵院鼎/法眼	PS1 / PS2	
2004	SD Gundam Force Great Battle! Dimension pirate de scare! ! SDガンダムフォース 大決戦！ 次元海賊デ・スカール！！	Pawn Airlies ポーンエアリーズ	PS1 / PS2	
2004	Empire Sengoku	Yuya / Prison god / Mr. Chen Wang 招夜/刑堂英/陳王高長	PS1 / PS2	
2004	Mario Power Tennis	Donkey Kong	GameCube, Wii	
2004	Donkey Kong Jungle Beat	Donkey Kong	GameCube, Wii	
2004	Soul Link	Gail Lantis	PC Adult; Koji Okada	
2005	Radiata Stories	Fire Dragon Parsec 火龍パーセク	PS1 / PS2	
2005	Popolocrois Story ~ Prince Pietro Adventure ~	Suhl / Whale Mac ズール/くじらのマック	PSP	
2005	Makai Kingdom: Chronicles of the Sacred Tome	Trizen	PS2	
2005	Mobile Suit Gundam One Year War	Demetry デミトリー	PS1 / PS2	
2005	Fire Emblem: Path of Radiance	Greil, Narrator		
2005	Absolute Obedience	Gallaher Morlock ギャラハー・モーロック	PC Adult; Mamoru Seyuno	
2005	Fullmetal alchemist 3 Girl succeeding God	Soldier (giant) 兵士（巨漢）	PS1 / PS2	
2005	Cobra: The Arcade	Zoros ゾロス	arcade	
2005	Soulcalibur III	Cervantes	PS2	
2005	Rogue Galaxy	Henry / Hara Volga ヘンリー/原人ボルガ	PS1 / PS2	
2005	Mega Man Maverick Hunter X	Spark Mandrill	PSP	
2005	Comic Party Portable	Horizontal man (Yokomoin Temple) ヨコ男（横蔵院蔕麿）	PSP	
2006	Disgaea 2	Makai Director 魔界ディレクター	PS1 / PS2	
2006	Black Cat: Kikai Shikake no Tenshi	Baronet バロネット	PS1 / PS2	
2006	Soul Link Extension	Gail Lantis, Wakatsuki Kenkichi ゲイル=ランティス/若槻謙吉	PS2	
2006	Blood+ One Night Kiss	Lewis / Kenzi Kitazaki ルイス/北崎研二	PS1 / PS2	
2006	Blood+ Final Piece	Lewis ルイス	PSP	
2006	Tenshi Gakuen Gekko	Kanae Hozoin	PS1 / PS2	
2006	Escape from Bug Island	Harry / Robert ハリー/ロバート	Wii	
2006	Dawn of Mana	Village Bilova 村長ビロバ	PS1 / PS2	
2007	Fire Emblem: Radiant Dawn	Narrator, Dheginsea ナレーション/デギンハンザー	Wii	
2008	Tales of Symphonia: Dawn of the New World	Tokunaga トクナガ	Wii	
2008	Prinny: Can I Really Be the Hero?	Gourmet Ogre / Morgan グルメオーガ/モーガン	PSP	
2009–2010	Phantom Brave	Sprout / Shishokab スプラウト/シシカバブ	Wii, PSP	
2009	Antiphona's chant princess - angel's music score Op. A ~	Henry アンリ	PSP	
2009	Dragon Ball: Raging Blast	Dodoria ドドリア	PS3, Xbox 360	
2009	La Pucelle Ragnarok	Salado Shinpu	PSP	
2010	Soul Link Ultimate	Gail Lantis	PC Adult; Okada Koji name	
2010	Dragon Ball: Raging Blast 2	Dodoria	PS3	
2010	Sekai Seifuku Kanojo	Ise Shinjuro 伊勢新十郎	PC Adult	
2010	Donkey Kong Country Returns	Donkey Kong	Wii	
2011	The Legend of Zelda: Ocarina of Time 3D	Ganondorf, Talon, Ingo	3DS	
2011	Nichijou: Uchuujin	Professor Tomioka 富岡先生	PSP	
2011	The Legend of Zelda: Skyward Sword	Demise	Wii	
2011	Dragon Ball Z: Ultimate Tenkaichi	Dodoria	PS3, Xbox 360	
2013	One Piece: Pirate Warriors 2	Jozu	PS3	
2013	Super Robot Wars Operation Extend	Nor Barkov ノル・バーコフ	PSP	
2014	Donkey Kong Country: Tropical Freeze	Donkey Kong	Wii U	
2014	Mario Kart 8	Donkey Kong	Wii U	
2015	Xenoblade Chronicles X	Dagahn	Wii U	
2016	Tales of Berseria	Dyle ダイル	PS3	
2018	Super Smash Bros. Ultimate	Ganondorf	Nintendo Switch	
2023	Fire Emblem Engage	Hyacinth	Nintendo Switch	
2022	Klonoa Phantasy Reverie Series	Leptio レプティオ	Multiplatform	

=== Tokusatsu ===
Year	Title	Role	Notes	Source
1996	Gekisou Sentai Carranger	Inventor Grotch		
1997	Denji Sentai Megaranger	Antlion Nejire	Ep. 22	
1998	Seijuu Sentai Gingaman	Kairikibou	Ep. 18	
1999	Kyuukyuu Sentai GoGo-V	Endurance Psyma Beast Garubaria	Ep. 37	
2000	Mirai Sentai Timeranger	Energy Thief Uugo	Ep. 23	
2002	Ninpuu Sentai Hurricaneger	Balloon Ninja Gomubi-Ron	Ep. 38	
2003	Bakuryū Sentai Abaranger	Bakuryu Tyrannosaurus		
2003	Bakuryū Sentai Abaranger vs. Hurricaneger	Bakuryū Tyrannosaurus	OV	
2005	Mahou Sentai Magiranger vs. Dekaranger	Argolian Barbon	Movie	
2007	Juken Sentai Gekiranger	Five Venom Fist Confrontation Beast Toad-Fist Maga	Ep. 4, 7 - 8	
2008	Engine Sentai Go-onger	Savage Sky Barbaric Machine Beast Shoukyaku Banki	Ep. 1	
2009	Samurai Sentai Shinkenger	Ayakashi Rokuroneri	Ep. 3	
2010	Tensou Sentai Goseiger	Yumajuu Tomarezu of the Tsuchinoko	Ep. 17	
2011	Kaizoku Sentai Gokaiger	Shieldon	Ep. 31	
2012	Tokumei Sentai Go-Busters	Shovelloid	Ep. 1	
2013	Zyuden Sentai Kyoryuger	Debo Roaroya	Ep. 3	
2015	Shuriken Sentai Ninninger	Advanced Yokai Oumukade	Ep. 35	
2018	Kaitou Sentai Lupinranger VS Keisatsu Sentai Patranger	Gabatt Kababacci	Ep. 21	

=== Drama CD ===
Year	Title	Role	Notes	Source
1996	CD Theater Dragon Quest VI Volume 2	King of medals メダル王		
1999	Miss Machiko	Headmaster		
2000	Karakurizōshi Ayatsuri Sakon	Villager		
2002	Sweet Underground スウィート・アンダーグラウンド	Superior / finger ring / rescue team 総帥/指鳴らし/救助隊	radio	
2006	Time Slip Sengoku period タイムスリップ戦国時代	Toshizo Saito 斎藤利三	radio	

=== Overseas dubbing ===
Year	Title	Role	Notes	Source
2005	Hitch	Albert Brennaman		
2005	Anchorman: The Legend of Ron Burgundy	Champion Kind		
2009	The Man	Agent Peters		
2009	Willy Wonka & the Chocolate Factory	Henry Salt		
2010	Invictus	Hendrick		
2014	Epic	Grub		
