= Florist Shop =

2010 video game

- Developer: Teyon
- Publishers: EU: Rondomedia; NA: UFO Interactive Games
- Platform: Nintendo DS
- Release: 29 June 2010
- Genre: Puzzle
- Mode: Single-player

Florist Shop is a puzzle game developed by Teyon for the Nintendo DS. The game is published by UFO Interactive Games in the North America and by Rondomedia in Germany, Switzerland and Austria.

== Gameplay ==
Screenshot of Florist Shop presenting the mechanics

Florist Shop is a combination of the match-3 and the time management genres. As in classical match-3 games, a player’s task is to switch neighbouring elements (here: flowers) to match a line of the same type. A player has to connect at least 3 identical flowers vertically or horizontally to make them disappear from the board. Gathered flowers are used to create 10 various bouquets ordered by the shop’s clients. The time management part of the game consists of creating all bouquets within the specified time. A player can freely choose which one to prepare first. As time goes by, flowers wilt on a board, and clients get impatient, so the final price of a bouquet falls. A player can use special items to prevent such situations. In each level, a player has to collect a specified amount of money to advance to the next stage. Plenty of add-ons and special items help to achieve a better score and make the game more challenging. Virtual money earned in the game can be used to buy add-ons, various bouquets, and special items.

=== Bouquets ===
The most important feature for bouquets is freshness. Bouquets of the highest price are made of fresh flowers that have just appeared on a board. When flowers start to wilt, a player can use a watering can or a sprinkler to improve their condition and prepare more valuable bouquets.

=== Add-ons ===
Add-ons are items that can increase the value of bouquets. Firstly, a player has to choose add-ons and buy them in the shop. They appear on a board as a tile with a ribbon symbol. A player chooses one of the add-ons visible on the left side of the board and collects it by matching 3 or more ribbons in a line. Now it can be used to improve a bouquet and to get an extra tip.

=== Special Items ===
Buying special items allows players to improve the florist shop or to influence a client's mood and the environment.

== See also ==
- Robot Rescue
- Ball Fighter
- 1001 Crystal Mazes Collection
- Super Swap
- 101 Shark Pets
