= Kururu =

Kururu may refer to:

== Anime ==
- Kururu Sumeragi, a character in the Air Gear series
- Sergeant Major Kururu (Kululu in English dub), a character in the Sgt. Frog series
- Kururu, a fairy in the 2003 anime Bottle Fairy series

== Video games ==
- Kururu, a character in the 1998 PlayStation Rhapsody: A Musical Adventure game
- Kururu, the main character in 2000 PlayStation Little Princess: Marl Ōkoku no Ningyō Hime 2 game

== Web comics ==
- Kururu, a character in the Brazilian webcomic Combo Rangers
