= Ball Fighter =

2009 video game

- Developer: Teyon
- Publisher: Teyon
- Platform: Nintendo DSi (DSiWare)
- Release: NA: December 7, 2009; PAL: July 2, 2010
- Genre: Puzzle
- Modes: Single-player, Multiplayer

Ball Fighter is a puzzle video game developed by Teyon for the Nintendo DSiWare. It is available in the Nintendo DSi Shop for 500 Nintendo DSi Points.

== Gameplay ==
Gameplay screenshot

Ball Fighter is a puzzle game for one or two players. The game's mechanics are based on removing colored spheres from the well. Spheres move from the top of the screen to the bottom and when they reach the bottom, the player loses the game. The player has to catch the spheres and throw them back to the well to connect at least three of the same color in one column and to make them disappear. Additional bonuses can make the game easier for the player or more difficult for the player's opponent.

Besides standard sphere removal and removal with the bonus spheres the player can make combos. A combo is made if the player removes more than two sphere chains quickly, one after another. This can be done either automatically (dropping spheres connect into chains) or activated by the player (by quickly throwing new spheres before the combo bar drops to zero). Combos allow the player to earn more points in the single-player modes and put more spheres in the opponent's well in the multiplayer mode.

=== Modes ===
- Arcade – a single-player game. A player's task is to destroy a specified number of spheres and advance to the next level. A higher speed of falling spheres and more colors of spheres make it more and more challenging.
- Survival – a single-player game. Players have to stay in the game as long as they can while spheres are dropping faster and faster.
- Brain Breaker – a split-screen mode. A player uses both screens simultaneously and has to remove spheres from both wells. When spheres reach the bottom of any well, it is game over.
- Player vs. CPU – a split-screen mode. Removed spheres are added to the opponent's well.
- Player vs. Player – a split-screen mode following the same rules as the Player vs. CPU mode, but with a human opponent instead of A.I.

== Reception ==
Ball Fighter received an overall score of 7/10 from Nintendo Life.

== See also ==
- Robot Rescue
- 1001 Crystal Mazes Collection
- Super Swap
- 101 Shark Pets
