= Robot Rescue =

2009 video game

- Developer: Teyon
- Publisher: Teyon
- Platform: Nintendo DSi (DSiWare)
- Release: NA: November 16, 2009; JP: September 22, 2010; PAL: November 12, 2010
- Genre: Puzzle
- Mode: Single-player

Robot Rescue is a puzzle game developed by Teyon for the Nintendo DSi. It was available for download at the Nintendo DSi Shop for 200 Nintendo DSi Points.

== Gameplay ==
A gameplay screenshot of Robot Rescue presenting a simple labyrinth and obstacles

A player's aim is to free robots trapped in an evil computer labyrinth. Missions are full of deadly traps making the game more and more difficult with each level. The objective is to guide robots to the exit through 45 labyrinths avoiding traps and obstacles such as mines, cloning machines and more. All robots are linked together, so when the player steers one of them, all are moved. Rash moves can destroy one of the robots and restart the mission.

=== Tiles ===
The following tiles can be found in the labyrinths:

- Red/yellow door - blocks the robot's way.
- Red/yellow button - opens red/yellow doors.
- Teleporter - transfers robots to a teleporter exit.
- Teleporter exit - a place where robots are teleported.
- Mine - blows robots up.
- Conveyor belt - moves robots automatically till the end of the belt.
- Short circuit trap - destroys robots.
- Glue stain - causes a temporary blockade of the robot's movement (1 move).
- Cloning machine - duplicates robots, clones emerge at all cloning machine exits.
- Cloning machine exit - a place where robots show after cloning.
- Exit - a destination point.

== Reception ==
Robot Rescue received an overall score of 8.0 from IGN.

== Sequels ==
- Robot Rescue 2 (DSiWare)
- Robot Rescue 3D (Nintendo eShop for Nintendo 3DS)
- Robot Rescue Revolution (Steam and PlayStation Network for PlayStation 3 and PlayStation Vita)

== See also ==
- Ball Fighter
- 1001 Crystal Mazes Collection
- Super Swap
- 101 Shark Pets
