= 1001 Crystal Mazes Collection =

2010 video game

- Developer: Teyon
- Publisher: Teyon
- Platform: Nintendo DSi (DSiWare)
- Release: NA: May 3, 2010; EU: December 10, 2010
- Genre: Puzzle
- Mode: Single-player

1001 Crystal Mazes Collection is a puzzle video game developed by Teyon and released for the Nintendo DSi in 2010. It was available in the Nintendo DSi Shop for 500 DSi Points.

== Gameplay ==
Gameplay screenshot

1001 Crystal Mazes Collection is a jewel logic game similar to Sokoban in which the player pushes colorful crystals around a maze to their target destinations. As the name suggests, there are 1001 mazes in all. The game becomes more challenging with each level.

There is a coin with an image of a girl or a boy that shows the player's current position and can be moved using both a D-pad and a stylus (by touching arrows visible on the touchscreen). The player can push a crystal in front of them when they move. Only one element can be moved at a time, and the positions of the walls cannot be changed. When a crystal is pushed into a corner or two of them are aligned next to each other alongside a wall, they can no longer be moved, which causes the player to lose.

The number of crystals visible on the screen is different in each maze. The simplest ones contain 3-4 elements; in the most difficult mazes, players have to move over 30 crystals.

== Reception ==
Reception

Review scores
| Publication | Score |
|---|---|
| IGN | 7/10 |
| Nintendo Life | 4/10 |

Reviewing 1001 Crystal Mazes Collection for IGN, Lucas M. Thomas praised the large variety of levels. In a review for Nintendo Life, Zach Kaplan referred to the game as a clone of Sokoban and wrote that most levels would be too difficult for the majority of players.

== See also ==
- Sokoban
- Robot Rescue
- Ball Fighter
- Super Swap
- 101 Shark Pets
