= Mastiff (company) =

American video game publisher

Mastiff LLC
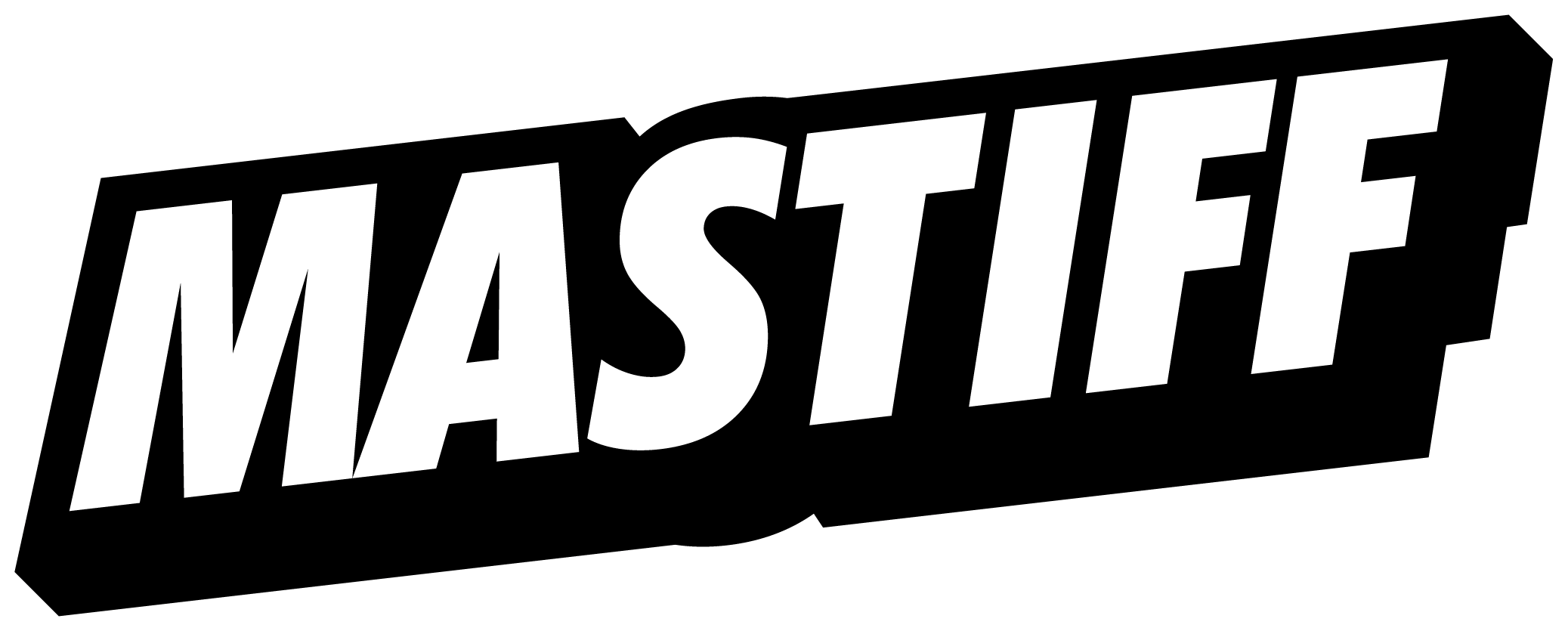
- Industry: Video games
- Founded: 2002
- Headquarters: Tokyo, Japan; San Francisco, California U.S.
- Key people: Bill Swartz, Mika Hayashi, Brian Bezdek, Dylan Strehle, Ron Kurtz
- Website: www.mastiff-games.com

Mastiff LLC is an American video game publisher. Founded in 2002 with headquarters in San Francisco and Tokyo, the company has released titles in virtually every genre – including action, adventure, RPG, FPS, party, horror, and music. The executive staff includes Bill Swartz, Mika Hayashi, and Brian Bezdek.

== Published games ==
Mastiff has published over 30 games since 2006, with titles ranging from arcade shooter to tactical RPG. First-person horror puzzle title Home Sweet Home (2017), Yggdrazil Group's first foray into game development, received positive reviews for its use of Thai folklore and fresh take on the horror genre. La Pucelle: Tactics (2002) is a tactical RPG by Nippon Ichi, known for its strong battle mechanics and compelling storyline. While often favorably compared to Disgaea, La Pucelle was in fact released first. The Heavy Fire series, developed by Polish group Teyon, are on-rail arcade shooters set in Somalia, South America, Afghanistan, and North Korea, respectively. The most recent addition to the series, Red Shadow, is available in VR for the PS4. Gurumin: A Monstrous Adventure is an action RPG best known for solid real-time action mechanics and excellent audio that features several well-known voice actors. Most recently, Fight Crab (2019) is a 3D action game for the Switch, based on an animated GIF.

Title	System	Release date	Ref
Dr. Sudoku	Game Boy Advance	April 26, 2006	
Top Gun: Combat Zones	Game Boy Advance	December 1, 2004	
Space Raiders	GameCube	April 19, 2004	
Space Invaders Revolution	Nintendo DS	September 20, 2005	
Top Gun	Nintendo DS	May 3, 2006	
Moon	Nintendo DS	January 13, 2009	
Deer Drive	Nintendo DS	November 27, 2012	
ATV: Wild Ride	Nintendo DS	March 30, 2011	
Gurumin: A Monstrous Adventure	Nintendo 3DS, PlayStation Portable, Microsoft Windows	October 13, 2016	
Dirt Jockey: Heavy Equipment Operator	PlayStation	July 13, 2003	
Easter Bunny's Big Day	PlayStation	April 1, 2003	
Gungrave: Overdose	PlayStation 2	September 15, 2004	
La Pucelle: Tactics	PlayStation 2	May 2004	
Pump It Up: Exceed	PlayStation 2, Xbox	August 31, 2005	
Technicbeat	PlayStation 2	November 2, 2004	
BandFuse: Rock Legends	PlayStation 3, Xbox 360	November 19, 2013	
Heavy Fire: Afghanistan	PlayStation 3, Microsoft Windows, Nintendo 3DS, Wii	November 15, 2011	
Heavy Fire: Shattered Spear	Xbox 360, PlayStation 3, Microsoft Windows	January 29, 2013	
Heavy Fire: Red Shadow	Xbox One, PlayStation 4, PS VR, Microsoft Windows	October 16, 2018	
Major League Eating: The Game	Wii	July 14, 2008	
Shimano Xtreme Fishing	Wii	October 9, 2009	
Deer Drive	Wii	May 29, 2012	
Reload	Wii, Microsoft Windows	November 18, 2010	
Remington Great American Bird Hunt	Wii	November 2, 2009	
Remington Super Slam Hunting: North America	Wii	November 9, 2010	
Remington Super Slam Hunting: Africa	Wii, Microsoft Windows	November 2010	
Remington Super Slam Hunting: Alaska	Wii, Microsoft Windows	November 2010	
The Great Outdoors	Microsoft Windows	2012	
The Tarnishing of Juxtia	Microsoft Windows	Summer 2022	
Tinytopia	Microsoft Windows, macOS	August 30, 2021	
Fight Crab	Nintendo Switch	August 12, 2019	
Gurumin 3D	Nintendo 3DS, PS Vita, PlayStation Portable, Microsoft Windows	October 12, 2016	
Home Sweet Home	PlayStation 4, PlayStation VR, Xbox One	September 27, 2017	
Arcade Islands	PlayStation 4, Xbox One	September 2, 2018	
Faerie Afterlight	Microsoft Windows	Summer 2022	
Party Planet	Nintendo Switch	December 12, 2017	
