= Terminator: Resistance =

2019 video game

- Developer: Teyon
- Publisher: Reef Entertainment
- Director: Piotr Łatocha
- Producers: Mariusz Sajak; Tomasz Dziobek
- Programmers: Mateusz Makowiec; Piotr Derkowski; Grzegorz Izydor
- Writer: Jerzy Zalewski
- Composers: Chris Detyna; Leszek Górniak; Jakub Gawlina
- Series: Terminator
- Engine: Unreal Engine 4
- Platforms: PlayStation 4; Windows; Xbox One; PlayStation 5; Xbox Series X/S
- Release: Windows, PS4, Xbox One; EU: November 15, 2019; NA: January 7, 2020; Enhanced; PlayStation 5; WW: April 30, 2021; Complete Edition; Xbox Series X/S; WW: October 27, 2023
- Genre: First-person shooter
- Mode: Single-player

Terminator: Resistance is a 2019 first-person shooter game developed by Teyon and published by Reef Entertainment for PlayStation 4, Windows, and Xbox One. The game is based on the Terminator franchise, set during the original future war depicted in the films The Terminator (1984) and Terminator 2: Judgment Day (1991).

Terminator: Resistance was released in Europe on November 15, 2019. In the United States, the Windows version was released a day earlier through Steam, while the other versions released on January 7, 2020. The game received mixed reviews from critics, but fans rated the game much higher. An enhanced version for PlayStation 5 was released on April 30, 2021, and for Xbox Series X/S on October 28, 2023.

== Gameplay ==
Terminator: Resistance is set in a post-apocalyptic 2028 and 2029 Los Angeles. Players take on the role of Jacob Rivers, a soldier from the Resistance led by John Connor against Skynet's robotic killing machines. The game features multiple possible endings.

In November 2020, a free update included a new game mode called Infiltrator Mode, allowing players to play as a T-800 infiltrator as it clears scavenger, resistance and Tech-Com patrols and hold-outs to locate an officer of the Resistance known as Daniel Ramirez.

Annihilation Line is downloadable content (DLC) released in December 2021. It is set during the middle of the main game's campaign mode, depicting the Future War segments in The Terminator. As Jacob Rivers, the player teams up with Kyle Reese to rescue a group of people captured by Skynet.

== Plot ==
=== Main story ===
On August 29, 1997, the military computer artificial intelligence defense network Skynet became self-aware and initiated a nuclear holocaust called Judgment Day. (Note: In Terminator 2, August 29, 1997 is the date established both by Sarah Connor and The Terminator that the original Judgment Day will have occurred on. The opening narration by protagonist Jacob Rivers reinforces the setting for the game.) In the decades that followed, Skynet became locked in a war to exterminate the surviving remnants of humanity. Meanwhile, pockets of human survivors organized themselves into a resistance military organization dedicated to the destruction of Skynet, led by John Connor.

In 2028, Jacob Rivers, aided by an unknown stranger, attempts to escape the ruins of Pasadena as Skynet's Annihilation Line makes its way through the area, having become the lone survivor of the Resistance's Pacific Division after being wiped out by a single new form of Infiltrator. After evading Skynet forces he is able to leave with a group of survivors including the scavenger Jennifer and her surrogate brother Patrick, another scavenger named Colin, former hospital nurse Erin, and their mechanic and impromptu leader Ryan. The group takes shelter in an abandoned set of industrial units where they discover a large cache of supplies reserved for them.

The group's safety is jeopardized when the same Infiltrator that destroyed Pacific Division kills Colin and injures Jacob while scouting before the Stranger intervenes. A nearby hospital is also found to house South Division prisoners for unknown experiments, the survivors of which Jacob is able to free. In response, Jacob meets with South Division's commander Jessica Baron, warning Baron that Skynet has a new form of infiltrator that can mimic human form. Refusing to believe him she swears him to silence before they're forced to flee a Skynet ambush. Jacob is brought into South Division and sent back to Pasadena to undertake reconnaissance of Skynet infrastructure being built there.

After completing the mission, Jacob returns to the Pasadena group's hideout only to be attacked by the Infiltrator again. Barely escaping after the Stranger's intervention, the group is forced to seek refuge at South Division's main shelter. Baron is eventually convinced of the Infiltrator's existence after South Division's defenses in Downtown Los Angeles are sabotaged and helps eliminate the Infiltrator pursuing Jacob. With few options left by 2029, (Note: The Annihilation Line DLC takes place between a two-month gap between Jacob defeating the Infiltrator and his assignment to meet Mack. The year 2029 did not get disclosed until the DLC's release) Connor orders Jacob to find the scientist Edwin Mack in Hollywood Hills, who had been exiled following a botched attempt to hack Skynet that caused the death of South Division's former commander.

Mack requests Jacob's help in acquiring Skynet's latest codes to hack its mainframe. While undertaking this task, Jacob is warned by the Stranger to convince the other Pasadena survivors to leave the bunker to avoid an unknown threat. Successfully acquiring the codes, Jacob learns from Mack that the new infiltration units had only started being produced mere days ago, confirming that Skynet will soon complete the Time Displacement Equipment project and that the Infiltrator sent to kill Jacob had come from a different future.

With time running out and utilizing the Stranger's aid, South Division uses Mack's information to launch an assault on Griffith Observatory where the Central Core is believed to be located. The assault is a failure as Skynet wipes out the assault force, kills the Stranger, and destroys the Resistance Shelter after being warned of future events by the Infiltrator. Having acquired the Central Core's true location from the Observatory, Jacob regroups with Connor's North Division. Connor informs Jacob that he has pre-knowledge of certain events and that the Stranger was Jacob himself from a different future to protect him from the Infiltrator.

In the final battle, Connor and Jacob assault Skynet's TDE facility while another unit takes out the Central Core in Colorado. Fighting through Skynet's defense grid, Jacob's team is able to reach the facility while the other unit successfully eliminates the core, rendering Skynet and all its machines inoperative. Despite the victory Skynet was able to send back three infiltrators to kill Sarah Connor, a young John Connor, and Jacob respectively, with Jacob being offered the choice to go back to protect himself or letting another volunteer go in his place.

The game ends showing the fate of the Pasadena survivors, with Jacob either saving himself from the T-800 as seen in the opening moments of the game if he returned to the past or remaining in the present to look for fellow survivors, meeting up with Jennifer and Patrick if they survived.

=== Annihilation Line ===
In 2012, a young Jacob is scavenging at the ruins of his father's high school. While rummaging through an old time-capsule, Jacob and his father are discovered by terminators and are chased through the ruins before getting trapped in the sewers nearby.

Waking back to the present in 2029, following the destruction of the first T-850 infiltrator, Jacob meets with Baron and Kyle Reese. On John Connor's orders, a team composed of Reese, Jacob, Ferro and Evans are sent to scout out the Northridge resistance outpost which has fallen silent. Arriving at the location they find the outpost overrun by Skynet forces, though with no sign of the previous inhabitants who had seemingly evacuated.

Following a radio transmission, the group head to Bakersfield despite it being just on the edge of the Annihilation Line's present position. Jacob finds an old man, Anselmo, trapped in a nearby graveyard. After escaping Anselmo confirms that infiltrators had kidnapped the population of the outpost, putting them to work at a nearby production facility. While resting, a Skynet force invades the team's safehouse, with a new HK Centurion walker unit crushing Anselmo as he wakes. After escaping the ambush, Reese reveals the real reason behind their mission, that Jacob's father was among the group of civilians captured from Northridge and that Skynet dedicated significant resources into recapturing them. Agreeing to mount a rescue, the team splits up and individually move into the Annihilation Line with the aim of creating a large diversion to enable an assault on the factory and the work camp the captives are being held in.

After causing enough mayhem to distract Skynet's security forces, the team assaults the factory itself. Fighting deep into the bowels of the facility the team finds signs that the captive prisoners have been slaughtered after finishing work on the new Cyberdyne 102 model of infiltrator, which has been based on Evans' likeness, before destroying the facility. After advancing to the work camp the team assist an in-progress mass break-out by those held there, with Ferro being killed while destroying an HK Tank while Evans is killed when the car he and Reese are in takes fire from an HK Aerial (Note: As depicted in the 1984 film The Terminator). After regrouping, Jacob and Reese enter the stadium where the remaining prisoners are being held, destroying an HK Centurion in the process with aid from prisoners they free.

In the aftermath, Jacob and Reese search through the cells to find Jacob's father, discovering him on the verge of death. Recognizing the name Kyle Reese, Jacob's father hands Reese a letter addressed to him from the school time-capsule before dying. As the pair return to base Reese reveals the contents of the letter, an old photo of Sarah Connor taken at a Mexican gas station.

=== Infiltrator Mode ===
A lone damaged T-800 model infiltrator in an unknown region of Los Angeles (Note: The map used is an expanded version of the Pasadena map used in the main game, but never made clear if it takes place there or is just asset re-use.) is dispatched by Skynet to locate and terminate Tech-Com officer Daniel Ramirez in a covert Tech-Com Bunker. To locate and gain access to the bunker the infiltrator harvests intel from the local area, including from scavenger hideouts, Resistance checkpoints, and Tech-Com facilities while using any and all means at its disposal including weapon caches and items picked up from the enemy. After completing its objective of eliminating Ramirez, the infiltrator accesses the Resistance computer in the base and sends Skynet data related to John Connor, being the name of his mother Sarah Connor.

== Release ==
In August 2013, UK video game publisher Reef Entertainment announced the acquisition of the video game rights from StudioCanal for Terminator 2: Judgment Day, and their intention to use them to create a video game with the working title Terminators: The Video Game.

Terminator: Resistance was announced in September 2019. It was developed by Poland-based Teyon and published by Reef Entertainment. In Europe and Australia, the game was released for PlayStation 4, Windows, and Xbox One on November 15, 2019. The Windows version also received a United States release on November 14 through Steam. In the US, the home console versions were delayed from December 3 to December 10. The release was subsequently pushed back to January 7, 2020, due to unexpected manufacturing delays. In Europe, the game included a free prequel comic book.

A sixth film in the franchise, Terminator: Dark Fate, was released shortly prior to the game's release, but the game does not have any relation or connection to its plot or characters.

An enhanced version of the game for PlayStation 5 was announced in December 2020 and released on April 30, 2021. An Xbox Series X/S version was released on October 27, 2023.

== Reception ==
Reception

Aggregate score
Aggregator	Score
Metacritic	60/100 (PC); 47/100 (PS4); 62/100 (PS5); 55/100 (XONE); 71/100 (XSXS)

Review scores
Publication	Score
Destructoid	4/10 (PS4)
Eurogamer	"Avoid"
IGN	4/10
PlayStation Official Magazine – UK	5/10 (PS4)
Push Square	5/10 (PS4); 4/10 (PS5)
VG247	2/5 (PS4)
Screen Rant	3/5 (PS5)

Terminator: Resistance received "mixed or average" reviews from critics, while the PS4 version received "generally unfavorable" reviews, according to review aggregator website Metacritic. The Windows version received "very positive" user reviews from Steam players.

Wesley Yin-Poole of Eurogamer called it "generic and boring". Alex Avard of GamesRadar called it the best Terminator game he had ever played, but wrote that "given the series' historically poor record when it comes to interactive entertainment, that's an admittedly low bar to clear." Avard also called it the worst game he had played in 2019. Zack Zwiezen of Kotaku favorably compared it with two earlier games published in the 1990s: The Terminator: Future Shock and Skynet.

The Annihilation Line DLC received "mixed or average" reviews according to Metacritic. Aaron Potter of Push Square opined that it lacked refinement as a result of budgetary issues, while Tristan Ogilvie of IGN called it "as forgettable" as the main game. Other critics noted improvements over the main game.
