= Arctic Escape =

2011 video game

- Developer: Teyon
- Publisher: Teyon
- Platforms: Nintendo DS (DSiWare), iOS
- Release: Nintendo DS: NA: February 21, 2011; EU: March 18, 2011; iOS; March 30, 2011
- Genre: Puzzle
- Mode: Single-player

Arctic Escape is a puzzle video game developed and published by Teyon for Nintendo DS and iOS in 2011. It was ported to Japan for release under the name Penguin Dai-Dasshutsu (ペンギン大脱出, Pengin Dai Dasshutsu) on November 14, 2012.

== Reception ==
Reception

Aggregate score
Aggregator	Score
Metacritic	(iOS) 71/100 (DS) 70/100

Review scores
Publication	Score
Eurogamer	(DS) 7/10
GamePro	(iOS)
Nintendo Life	(DS)

The game received "mixed or average reviews" according to the review aggregation website Metacritic.
