= Fight Crab =

2020 video game

- Developer(s): Nussoft
- Publisher(s): Playism (Steam); Calappa Games (Itch.io/Booth); Mastiff (Switch); Winning Starters (Android); Pujjia8 (iOS)
- Platform(s): Android, iOS, Nintendo Switch, Windows
- Release: Windows: WW: July 30, 2020; Nintendo Switch: WW: September 15, 2020; Mobile: WW: November 2021
- Genre(s): Fighting
- Mode(s): Single-player, multiplayer

Fight Crab (カニノケンカ) is a 2020 3D fighting video game developed by Nussoft. It is a weapons-based fighter involving crabs in the real world, with the player's goal being that of flipping their opponents onto their backs to deliver a finishing blow.

== Gameplay ==
Gameplay screenshot

There are 23 different species of crustacean as well as 48 weapons and a variety of game modes as the player's giant-sized crab battles against rivals. Fight Crab also has a multiplayer mode.

== Development and release ==
The game was developed by Japanese indie studio Calappa Games, or Nussoft, under Masafumi Onuki. Onuki has stated that the game was inspired by Dark Souls. Fight Crab was released as early access on the Steam platform in August 2019 before its full release on July 30, 2020. It was later ported and released on the Nintendo eShop, and later on the App Store and Play Store.

== Reception and legacy ==
Reception

Aggregate score
Aggregator	Score
Metacritic	60/100

Review score
Publication	Score
Famitsu	29/40

Fight Crab received "mixed or average" critical reviews according to aggregator Metacritic.

A sequel, Fight Crab 2, was released as early access on Steam in February 2024.
