= Space Raiders (video game) =

2002 video game

- North American GameCube cover art
- Developer: Taito
- Publishers: JP: Taito; EU: Sammy Europe; NA: Mastiff
- Series: Space Invaders
- Platforms: GameCube, PlayStation 2
- Release: PlayStation 2: JP: December 19, 2002; PAL: September 5, 2003; GameCube: JP: January 9, 2003; NA: April 19, 2004
- Genre: Third-person shooter
- Mode: Single-player

Space Raiders (スペースレイダース, Supēsu reidāsu), known in Europe as Space Invaders: Invasion Day, is a 2002 third-person shooter video game developed by Taito, a remake of the original 1978 Space Invaders arcade game from its creators. Re-imagined for the sixth generation home consoles, Space Raiders takes the surface-to-air shooting action of the original title and puts it into a third-person urban street setting on the GameCube (Japan and North America) and PlayStation 2 (the latter only in Japan and Europe). This update features detailed opening cinematics of the alien invasion, story and survival modes, boss battles and three playable characters, each with their own backstory.

== Plot ==
Massive saucer-shaped objects appear in the city skyline of an unnamed city and begin bombing the city below. Explosions continue to reverberate through the city as gigantic plumes of black smoke spring up from the buildings.

The origin of the saucer-shaped objects is unknown. One observer reported seeing scores of green beings emerging from craft, spreading out across the ground and assaulting humans fleeing the aerial bombardment.

Authorities have concluded that the saucer-shaped flying objects are "space invaders". The city has been declared off limits, and the authorities have announced that there are no survivors. However, according to reporters, two males (Justin and Naji) and one female (Ashley), all armed, were spotted heading toward the city center where the alien saucers seem to have gathered. One of the males is apparently a minor (Justin).

== Gameplay ==
The playable characters include a street teen named Justin, a fashion photographer named Ashley, and a police officer named Naji (all of whom have similar play styles). From a fixed height behind the protagonists, the player directs them to aim and shoot at increasingly large waves of various aliens as approach the character's position. Characters can move side-to-side as in the original arcade game, but also have limited movement both into and away from the screen.

Occasional power-ups become available, giving the player temporary access to special weapons. Strategic use of power-ups is required, as the variety of aliens and diversity of their attacks will not allow for the straight forward shooting of the original arcade game. The game contains six missions and can be completed in under two hours. A port of the original Space Invaders arcade game is included and unlocked by a cheat.

== Release ==
Taito revealed the game in November 2002 for a release in December on the PlayStation 2, and January for the GameCube.

In Mid-2003, Sammy Europe acquired European publishing rights to the title. The game was localised and released in September 2003 as a PlayStation 2 exclusive.

In February, it was announced that the game would be released in North America as a GameCube exclusive. In March, it was announced that Mastiff would release the game in April as a budget title. The PlayStation 2 version of the game was re-released as a budget title in Japan by D3 Publisher under their Simple series later on in the year.

== Reception ==
Reception

Aggregate scores
Aggregator	Score
GameRankings	50.5%
Metacritic	40 / 100

Review scores
Publication	Score
Famitsu	7/10, 6/10, 5/10, 5/10 (PS2)
Nintendo Power	3/5
The Laser	C+
VGPub	9.5 / 10

Space Raiders received generally negative reviews, earning a score of 40 out of 100 from Metacritic. Criticisms included poor graphics, repetitive gameplay and infidelity to Space Invaders. ScrewAttack named it the worst remake or reboot in video gaming because of its radical, unsuccessful departure from the original Space Invaders franchise.

Alex Navarro of GameSpot heavily panned the game, saying "fans of modern shooters will have no use for this trite, monotonous junk, and fans of the original Space Invaders will simply be appalled at how Taito has butchered its classic gameplay into this one-dimensional mess." The site later included the game in its list of the "Top 10 Most Frightfully Bad Games of 2004", where Navarro further ridiculed the game as "a truckload of suck".
