= Teyon =

Polish video games developer

Teyon S.A.
- Type: Private
- Industry: Video games
- Founded: 2006
- Headquarters: Kraków, Poland
- Products: RoboCop: Rogue City; Terminator: Resistance; Heavy Fire: Special Operations; Robot Rescue; Battle Rage
- Website: teyon.com

Teyon S.A. is a Polish video games developer, producer, and publisher. Founded in 2006, the company has two offices in Poland (Kraków and Łódź) and one in Tokyo, Japan, with three development teams.

== History ==
Teyon was founded in 2006 in Kraków, Poland.

In 2007, Teyon released its first video game, Burn, a first-person shooter. It was followed by Battle Rage and District Wars: Pure Action in 2008 and Blind Shot: Assassin's Confession in 2009.

In 2009, Teyon debuted on Nintendo Download services with DSiWare puzzle games Robot Rescue and Ball Fighter, followed by Hubert the Teddy Bear: Winter Games a WiiWare family game in 2010. The same year 4 games other games were published on DSiWare including 101 MiniGolf World (arcade sports), 1001 Crystal Mazes Collection (puzzle), Super Swap (puzzle) and 101 Shark Pets (pet caring simulation).

At the end of 2011, Teyon obtained a license from Nintendo to publish games in Japan. In the past, Teyon Japan published titles on the Nintendo 3DS, DSiWare, WiiWare, WiiU, PlayStation 3 and mobile platforms such as au Smart Pass by KDDI. Notable titles published by Teyon Japan include Moonlighter, Bomber Crew, X Morph: Defence, The Way Remastered, The Flame in the Flood and many more. The scope of services offered by Teyon Japan includes translations, QA and localization, publishing, ratings, public relations and marketing.

Teyon released an arcade shooting series for WiiWare, PlayStation 3 and Xbox 360. The first part Heavy Fire: Special Operations appeared in July 2010 in North America and December 2010 in Europe. Sequels, Heavy Fire: Black Arms for WiiWare and Heavy Fire: Afghanistan for PC, PlayStation 3 and Wii, were released in 2011, followed by Heavy Fire: Shattered Spear in January 2013 on PlayStation 3 and Xbox 360.

In 2012, Teyon released a number of Nintendo eShop games, including Crazy Chicken: Pirates, Outdoors Unleashed: Africa 3D and Bird Mania 3D which reached number 1 in the Nintendo eShop Charts. Since 2012 Teyon started a research project Audio and Video Raytracer (RAYAV) in consortium with AGH DSP. The project is aimed to make an audio and video engine of a new generation.

In 2018, Teyon founded a sister company in Łódź under the name Digital Bards, which acts as a developer and digital publisher of casual games. The company is a whole subsidiary of Teyon, and focuses on delivering and publishing indie, casual and easy-to-pick & easy-to-play entertainment across all markets around the globe. Digital Bards's products are designed for consoles and personal computers and are delivered through physical retail, digital download and online platforms.

In September 2019, Teyon announced that they were developing Terminator: Resistance, a first-person shooter game, that was released on 15 November 2019 in Europe/Australia, and on 3 December 2019 in North America. The game's story is set in post-apocalyptic 2028 Los Angeles and serves as a prequel to James Cameron's Terminator franchise films The Terminator (1984) and Terminator 2: Judgment Day (1991). Players take on the role of a new character, Jacob Rivers, a soldier in the John Connor-led human resistance against Skynet's robotic killing machines.

In July 2021, Teyon announced that they were developing RoboCop: Rogue City, a first-person shooter, that was released on 2 November 2023. The game is set in-between the films RoboCop 2 and RoboCop 3.

== Games developed ==
Year	Game	Platform(s)
2006	WR Rally	Windows
2007	Burn	Windows
2007	1001 MiniGolf Challenge	Windows
2007	101 Pony Pets	Windows
2007	101 Dino Pets	Windows
2007	101 Bunny Pets	Windows
2007	101 Kitty Pets	Windows
2007	101 Puppy Pets	Windows
2007	Jewels of the Nile	Windows
2007	Dynasty of Egypt	Windows
2007	Crystal Caverns of Amon-Ra	Windows
2007	Battle Rage	Windows
2008	Battle Rage	Wii
2008	Casual Strike	Windows
2008	Club Vegas Casino	Windows
2008	District Wars: Pure Action	Windows
2009	Ball Fighter	DSiWare
2009	Robot Rescue	DSiWare
2009	101 Dino Pets DS	Nintendo DS
2009	101 Dolphin Pets	Windows
2009	101 Penguin Pets	Windows
2009	101 Otter Pets	Windows
2009	101 Shark Pets	Windows
2009	101 Seal Pets	Windows
2009	Mahjongg Championship 3.0	Windows
2009	Mahjongg Platinum	Windows
2009	Blind Shot: Assassin's Confession	Windows
2009	Weekend Party: Fashion Show	Windows
2009	My Fitness	Windows
2010	101 Shark Pets	DSiWare
2010	Super Swap	DSiWare
2010	1001 Crystal Mazes Collection	DSiWare
2010	101 MiniGolf World	DSiWare
2010	Florist Shop	Nintendo DS
2010	Mini Golf Resort	Wii
2010	KidFit: Island Resort	Wii
2010	Hubert the Teddy Bear: Winter Games	WiiWare
2010	Ghost Mania	WiiWare
2010	Heavy Fire: Special Operations	WiiWare
2011	101 Pinball World	DSiWare
2011	Crystal Caverns of Amon-Ra	DSiWare
2011	1001 BlockBusters	DSiWare
2011	Arctic Escape	DSiWare, iOS
2011	101 Dolphin Pets	DSiWare
2011	Chronicles of Vampires: Origins	DSiWare
2011	Angel Code: A Linda Hyde Mystery	Nintendo 3DS, Windows
2011	Mini Golf Resort DS	Nintendo DS
2011	Vampire Mansion: A Linda Hyde Mystery	Nintendo DS, Windows
2011	1001 Touch Games	Nintendo DS
2011	Heavy Fire: Afghanistan	PlayStation 3, Wii, Windows
2011	Heavy Fire: Black Arms	WiiWare
2011	Hubert the Teddy Bear: Backyard Games	Windows
2011	Hubert the Teddy Bear: Holiday Island	Windows
2011	Aqua Park Tycoon	Windows
2011	Pet Hotel Tycoon	Windows
2011	Hubert the Teddy Bear: Winter Games	Windows
2012	Crazy Chicken: Pirates 3D	Nintendo 3DS
2012	Outdoors Unleashed: Africa 3D	Nintendo 3DS
2012	Heavy Fire: Special Operations 3D	Nintendo 3DS
2012	Bird Mania 3D	Nintendo 3DS
2012	Chronicles of Vampires: The Awakening	DSiWare
2012	Cat Frenzy	DSiWare
2012	Escape the Virus: Swarm Survival	DSiWare
2012	Escape the Virus: Shoot'Em Up	DSiWare
2012	Robot Rescue 2	DSiWare
2012	Wizard Defenders	DSiWare
2012	Drop Zone: Under Fire	WiiWare
2013	Clash of Elementalists	DSiWare
2013	101 Dino Pets 3D	Nintendo 3DS
2013	Groove Heaven	Nintendo 3DS
2013	Robot Rescue 3D	Nintendo 3DS
2013	Robot Rescue Revolution	PlayStation 3
2013	Heavy Fire: Shattered Spear	PlayStation 3, Xbox 360, Windows
2013	Bird Mania	iOS
2014	Chat-A-Lot	Nintendo 3DS
2014	Steel Empire	Nintendo 3DS
2014	Rambo: The Video Game	PlayStation 3, Xbox 360, Windows
2015	Iron Combat: War in the Air	Nintendo 3DS
2016	Ocean Runner	Nintendo 3DS
2017	Tallowmere	Nintendo Switch
2017	Party Planet (30-in-1 Game Collection Volume 1)	Nintendo Switch
2017	Urban Trial Freestyle 2	Nintendo 3DS
2017	Worlds of Magic: Planar Conquest	PlayStation 4, Xbox One
2017	Warlocks vs Shadows	PlayStation 4
2018	Arcade Islands: Volume One	PlayStation 4, Xbox One
2018	Urban Trial Playground	Nintendo Switch
2018	Steel Empire	Windows
2019	30-in-1 Game Collection Volume 2	Nintendo Switch
2019	Terminator: Resistance	PlayStation 4, Windows, Xbox One, PlayStation 5, Xbox Series X/S
2020	Monster Truck Championship	Nintendo Switch, PlayStation 4, Xbox One, PlayStation 5
2023	RoboCop: Rogue City	PlayStation 5, Windows, Xbox Series X/S
2024	Rennsport	PlayStation 5, Windows, Xbox Series X/S
2025	RoboCop: Rogue City ‒ Unfinished Business	PlayStation 5, Windows, Xbox Series X/S
2027	Hunter: The Reckoning – Deathwish	PlayStation 5, Windows, Xbox Series X/S
