= Rhapsody III: Memories of Marl Kingdom =

2000 video game

- PlayStation 2 cover art
- Developer: Nippon Ichi Software
- Publisher: Nippon Ichi Software: WW: NIS America
- Composer: Tenpei Sato
- Series: Rhapsody
- Platforms: PlayStation 2; PlayStation 3; Microsoft Windows; Nintendo Switch; PlayStation 5
- Release: December 21, 2000: PlayStation 2; JP: December 21, 2000 PlayStation 3; JP: December 17, 2014 Windows; WW: August 29, 2023 Nintendo Switch, PlayStation 5; NA: August 29, 2023; EU: September 1, 2023; JP: August 29, 2024
- Genre: Role-playing video game
- Mode: Single-player

Rhapsody III: Memories of Marl Kingdom (Note: Known as Tenshi no Present: Marl Ōkoku Monogatari (Japanese: 天使のプレゼント マール王国物語, Hepburn: Tenshi no Puresento: Māru Ōkoku Monogatari; lit. "Angel's Present: Marl Kingdom Story") in Japan.) is a 2000 role-playing video game developed and published by Nippon Ichi Software for the PlayStation 2. It is the third installment in the Rhapsody series.

Instead of the 2D graphics of the other Rhapsody games, Memories of Marl Kingdom uses 3D backgrounds, but the character sprites themselves are kept 2D, much like many other Nippon Ichi games released afterwards.

== Story ==
Memories of Marl Kingdom, unlike the earlier games in the series, consists of six separate chapters, each of which features different characters from the Rhapsody series. The chapters take place in various times before or after the stories of A Musical Adventure and Ballad of the Little Princess. These chapters often address unanswered questions from the earlier games, or provide additional insight into the characters.

=== Chapters ===
- Chapter one: The first chapter is set early in Cornet's adventure in A Musical Adventure and takes place after Ferdinand has been turned to stone. Cornet, Kururu, and Etoile get lost in a forest and end up in a town full of anthropomorphic mushrooms. There, they decide to find a young girl's missing mother. This was one of two scenarios that was included in the DS remake of A Musical Adventure.
- Chapter two: The second chapter takes place four years after Ballad of the Little Princess. Kururu, now sixteen, has decided to marry Cello. In order to get her father to accept Cello as a suitable husband, Kururu has to win the upcoming Miss Marl Kingdom competition. This serves as an epilogue to Little Princess. In this chapter, it is heavily implied that Kururu and Cello will eventually be the parents of Homard from La Pucelle: Tactics.
- Chapter three: The third adventure is not firmly established anywhere on the series timeline. The Nyankos of the Marjoly Family have gone missing, and the four women set out to find why they have disappeared.
- Chapter four: The fourth chapter takes place immediately before the events in Ballad of the Little Princess. Pekonyan, a servant of the Akurjo Family, is in love with Pokonyan, a Nyanko for the Marjoly Family. Pekonyan is distraught when she realizes that the Akurjo Family is going to war with the Marjoly Family, and decides to assassinate Akurjo before this happens.
- Chapter five: The fifth and longest chapter in the game takes place thousands of years before A Musical Adventure and, due to its length, is the only chapter in the game to be broken into multiple sub-chapters. This chapter follows Cherie's life from start to finish, from the last days of the Ancient civilization, to the birth of Cornet, to Cherie's death. This is the second bonus chapter to be included in the DS remake of A Musical Adventure.
- Chapter six: The sixth chapter is a bonus boss rush event. In this chapter, every single playable character from every chapter is brought together, regardless of when or where their stories take place, to defeat the Dark Lord.

== Gameplay ==
Memories of Marl Kingdom is a typical RPG, complete with experience points, parties of characters, and spell casting. In each chapter, the player guides different characters through their adventure, engaging in several battles along the way.

Scene from the fourth chapter

=== Battle ===
The battle system is completely different from earlier Marl games. The player's party consists of up to 12 characters divided into rows of 4. The player can only have direct control of the row leaders. The other characters in each row, called "partners", cannot normally be controlled and attack randomly. The only characters that can be controlled even when they are not in the front row are puppets, and they can only be controlled by Cornet, Cello, Kururu or Cherie.

The party consists of humans, puppet users, puppets and monsters. Each character, when acting as a partner, will raise or lower the statistics of the row leader. Depending on party organization, special attacks can be unlocked for the row leader.

Instead of paying for spells like in Ballad of the Little Princess, the characters use SP for spell casting.

== Legacy ==
Along with Rhapsody: A Musical Adventure and Rhapsody II: Ballad of the Little Princess, this game is part of the Marl Kingdom series created by Nippon Ichi. It also acts as a prelude to the later Nippon Ichi game La Pucelle: Tactics. Although released on a different system with a new battle system, Memories of Marl Kingdom maintains many of the themes of the previous games. The graphics remain bright and colorful, but backgrounds are now in 3D.

The game was released in North America and Europe as a part of Rhapsody: Marl Kingdom Chronicles in 2023.

=== Soundtrack ===
A soundtrack of the game's song was released on February 21, 2001. Like other Marl games, the music was composed by Tenpei Sato.
