= Gurumin =

2004 video game

Gurumin: A Monstrous Adventure
- Developer: Nihon Falcom (Note: 2015 Windows version by Opus Studio. Nintendo 3DS version developed in conjunction with iNPLAS, Opus Studio, and Mastiff.)
- Publishers: JP: Nihon Falcom; NA: Mastiff; EU: 505 Game Street; JP: Flyhigh Works (3DS)
- Director: Takayuki Kusano
- Producer: Masayuki Katou
- Programmer: Hideyuki Yamashita
- Artists: Hiromi Okada; Shunsuke Itou
- Writer: Toshihiro Kondo
- Platforms: Windows, PlayStation Portable, Nintendo 3DS
- Release: Windows: JP: December 25, 2004; WW: March 30, 2015; PlayStation Portable: JP: June 29, 2006; NA: February 12, 2007; EU: March 23, 2007; Nintendo 3DS: NA: October 13, 2016; EU: October 27, 2016; JP: November 30, 2016
- Genres: Action role-playing, Platform
- Mode: Single-player

Gurumin: A Monstrous Adventure (Note: Japanese: ぐるみん, Hepburn: Gurumin) is a 2004 action role-playing game developed by Nihon Falcom. The game stars a girl named Parin who wields a drill weapon who fights against phantoms who attack a village of monsters. The game features real time combat, rather than turn based combat. It features full voice acting for its characters.

The game was initially released for Windows, before being ported to the PlayStation Portable and 3DS.

== Plot ==
A girl named Parin goes to live with her grandfather in Tiese Town while her parents are overseas excavating an ancient ruin. After being told that there are no other children in Tiese, she finds what looks like another girl who is being threatened by a dog. Parin rescues the girl and discovers that she is actually a monster (お化け, obake) which only children and animals can see. To thank Parin, Pino takes her through a hidden entrance in a wall near her house to Monster Village. Evil creatures known as Phantoms of attacks on Monster Village. Parin, who unearths a legendary drill, decides to fight against the phantoms and restore Monster Village.

== Gameplay ==
Gurumin is a 3D action RPG with heavy emphasis on action through real-time combat and platforming. Parin can acquire various headwear which have varying effects while equipped, such as protection from water damage, stronger attacks, or HP restoration. Each piece of headwear can be upgraded to increase their effects. Parin's drill has up to four power levels that are increased through combat or restoration points in levels and decreased by taking damage. The current level of her drill dictates damage that can be dealt and can change up and down frequently in each level. Various consumable items can be bought or found which are used during levels to restore HP or drill power.

Gurumin offers replayability by offering new difficulty levels upon completion of the game. The game starts with Beginner and Normal modes; Hard, Happy, and Crazy modes are opened up with completion of the previous difficulty level. While each difficulty alters the strength of the enemies, some also change other elements of the game, such as removing environmental hazards in Beginner mode, an altered game script in Happy mode (Japanese version only), and only allowing damaging of enemies through critical hits in Crazy mode.

In addition to headwear that gives characters various abilities and protection there is also a number of outfits that can be equipped. Matching the right outfit with the right hat could unlock additional abilities. These are acquired by purchasing from the (vending machine), completing the game at a set difficulty level, or through other means, such as playing on the right date when a special event happens.

== Release ==
It was originally released in Japan in December 2004 for Windows. A PlayStation Portable version was later released in Japan in June 2006, then in 2007 in North America by Mastiff in February and in Europe by 505 Game Street in March. A Nintendo 3DS version, titled Gurumin 3D, was released in 2016. It was released on the Steam platform in 2015.

== Reception ==
Reception

Aggregate score
Aggregator	Score		
Aggregator	3DS	PC	PSP
Metacritic	72/100	N/A	78/100

Review scores
Publication	Score		
Publication	3DS	PC	PSP
Destructoid	N/A	9/10	N/A
Eurogamer	N/A	N/A	7/10
Famitsu	N/A	N/A	31/40
Game Informer	N/A	N/A	7/10
GamePro	N/A	N/A	3.75/5
GameSpot	N/A	N/A	8/10
GameSpy	N/A	N/A	4/5
IGN	N/A	N/A	8/10
PlayStation: The Official Magazine	N/A	N/A	8/10
The New York Times	N/A	N/A	(favorable)

The game received "generally favorable reviews" according to the review aggregation website Metacritic. In Japan, Famitsu gave the PSP version a total of 31 out of 40.

Subsequent reviews for the 3DS port have been "mixed or average".
