= Dr. Sudoku =

2006 video game

- Developer: Success
- Publisher: Success (Japan) Mastiff (NA) 505 Gamestreet (UK)
- Platform: Game Boy Advance
- Release: JP: 6 April 2006; NA: 26 April 2006; UK: May 2006
- Genre: Puzzle
- Mode: Single-player

Dr. Sudoku is a 2006 sudoku puzzle video game developed and published by Success in Japan. The game was later published by Mastiff in North America and 505 Gamestreet in the United Kingdom. Upon release, the game received average reviews, with critics enjoying the puzzles, but considering the game lacked additional features and was less accessible than other methods to play the game.

== Gameplay ==
Gameplay screenshot

Gameplay consists of sudoku puzzles, involving completion of a nine-by-nine grid of numbers, with each line and three-by-three grid containing the numbers one to nine. The game features 20 levels each with 50 puzzles, across various difficulty levels, with harder levels containing fewer numbers initially set in the grid. It also features a hint system allowing players to see where one number is or is not located on the grid. Players can also create their own sudoku puzzles using an in-game editor and save them on the cart.

== Reception ==
Reception

Aggregate score
Aggregator	Score
Metacritic	68%

Review scores
Publication	Score
AllGame	2.5/5
GameSpot	6.8/10
GameZone	7/10
IGN	6.5/10

Several critics felt Dr. Sudoku was interchangeable with other sudoku titles, and had been better executed elsewhere. Jeff Gerstmann of GameSpot felt the use of the D-pad "isn't the ideal way to play" sudoku compared to the touch controls on the Nintendo DS, but the game was nonetheless a "stout package" of puzzles. Comparing the game to Game Boy Advance title Sudoku Fever, Anise Hollingshead of Gamezone considered Dr. Sudoku to be simpler and have less appealing graphics, but feature more puzzles and playing options. Despite praising the "fine collection of puzzles", Craig Harris of IGN similarly felt the game was less accessible and more expensive than a pen-and-paper version of sudoku puzzles, lamenting the missed opportunity for multiplayer play.
