= Hubert the Teddy Bear: Winter Games =

2010 video game

- Developer: Teyon
- Publisher: Teyon
- Platform: Wii (WiiWare)
- Release: NA: February 8, 2010
- Genres: Sports, Party
- Modes: Single-player, Multiplayer

Hubert the Teddy Bear: Winter Games is a sports party game developed by Teyon for the WiiWare. It was available in the WiiWare Shop for 500 Wii Points before the shop's closure in 2019.

== Gameplay ==
Hubert the Teddy Bear: Winter Games is a party game offering 8 winter-related minigames including snowball fights and snowman building. Both single-player and multiplayer modes are available - players can compete in the Olympiad mode for up to 16 players. The game provides 3 levels of difficulty: child, youngster and adult. Players can also customize their characters by choosing genders, giving names or changing clothes.

=== Minigames ===
A gameplay screenshot of Hubert the Teddy Bear: Winter Games presenting the fishing mini-game

- Sledge ride - players have to hold the Wii Remote in a vertical position and move it up and down to gather speed. The goal is to collect gifts lost by a bunny.
- Playing on icicles - 5 icicles are visible on the screen and 5 buttons on the Wii Remote and the Nunchuk are associated with them. The player's task is to repeat a heard melody as precisely as possible.
- Fishing - players have to swing the Wii Remote or the Nunchuk and push a button displayed above a fish to catch it. Otherwise, a fish will escape.
- Bunny chase - players have to wave the Wii Remote and the Nunchuk to catch a bunny running in front of players. Players need to jump to evade beams on a road or push the B and the Z buttons at the same time to slide under a branch.
- Making a snowman - players have to use the Nunchuk stick to move left or right and perform gestures or to push a presented button in order to make a snowman.
- Running up a hill - players have to wave the Wii Remote and the Nunchuk to run and to move it left/right to evade snowballs. When crashing with a frozen snowball, a teddy bear loses points. When pushing the Z button on the Nunchuk, a teddy bear speeds up, smashes a regular snowball and collects gifts.
- Snow fight - players push the A button to aim, swing the Wii Remote and push the Z button on the Nunchuk to throw a snowball.
- Decorating a Christmas tree - players choose decorations by pushing the A button on the Wii Remote and hang them on the tree in a marked place.

== Reception ==
Hubert the Teddy Bear: Winter Games received mixed reviews, with an overall score of 75% from Gamer Pop, a 19/30 from Wiiloveit.com, a 5/10 from IGN, and a 5/10 from Nintendo Life.
