= Marl Jong!! =

2003 video game

- Box art
- Developer: Nippon Ichi Software
- Publisher: Nippon Ichi Software
- Series: Rhapsody
- Platform: PlayStation
- Release: JP: April 24, 2003
- Genre: Mahjong
- Modes: Single-player, multiplayer

Marl Jong!! (Note: Japanese: マールじゃん!!, Hepburn: Māru Jan !!) is a 2003 mahjong video game developed and published by Nippon Ichi Software for the PlayStation. It is a spin-off of the Rhapsody series and released at the end of the PlayStation's lifespan, long after main installments were released for the PlayStation 2. It was never released outside Japan until Hamster Corporation released it as part of their Console Archives series for the Nintendo Switch 2 and PlayStation 5 in October 2026.

== Gameplay ==
Gameplay screenshot

The player controls characters of the Rhapsody series as they face off in mahjong battles. The player can use various character-exclusive activities as well as "cheat techniques" to gain an advantage. It includes new story content in addition to its gameplay. Players can also engage in local multiplayer matches.
