= Heavy Fire =

- Genre: Rail shooter
- Developer: Teyon
- Platforms: Wii, Nintendo 3DS, Windows, PlayStation 3, Xbox 360
- First release: Heavy Fire: Special Operations; 2010
- Latest release: Heavy Fire: Red Shadow; 2018

Heavy Fire is a series of on-rails arcade shooter video games developed by Polish video game developer Teyon between 2010 and 2013 and Anshar from 2018 to present. The series includes five games: Heavy Fire: Special Operations (2010), Heavy Fire: Black Arms (2011), Heavy Fire: Afghanistan (2011), Heavy Fire: Shattered Spear (2013), and Heavy Fire: Red Shadow (2018).

== Games ==
=== Special Operations ===
Heavy Fire: Special Operations
- Developer: Teyon
- Publisher: Teyon
- Platforms: Wii (WiiWare), Nintendo 3DS (eShop)
- Release: WiiWare: NA: 2010-07-26; PAL: 2010-12-31; Nintendo 3DS eShop: NA: 2012-09-12; PAL: 2012-10-25
- Genres: Shooter, Arcade, Action
- Modes: Single-player, Multiplayer

Heavy Fire: Special Operations is an on-rails arcade shooter developed by Teyon for the WiiWare and Nintendo 3DS. It first appeared as a WiiWare title in North America on July 26, 2010 and in the PAL region on December 31, 2010. An updated version for the Nintendo 3DS, called Heavy Fire: Special Operations 3D, was released on September 13, 2012 in North America, and on October 25, 2012 in the PAL region for the Nintendo eShop.

A gameplay screenshot of Heavy Fire: Special Operations presenting a co-operative multiplayer mode

Heavy Fire: Special Operations is a shooting game set in Somalia where players join the elite special force fighting against terrorists. A player starts the game as a Private equipped with a pistol and his goal is to eliminate opponents and gain as many points as possible to advance in the military hierarchy. Players can get several bonuses and perform combos like ‘Leader Kill’, ‘Demolition Man’, ‘Lord of Destruction’ and others, helping to achieve a higher score. Missions can be run using the light-gun from the ground, Humvee or Blackhawk.

There are 6 ranks to achieve: Private First Class, Corporal, Sergeant, Staff Sergeant, Master Sergeant and Sergeant Major. Each of them is linked to one of 7 specific guns, so the more points are gathered, the better the weapon can be used.

The game provides a single-player and a co-operative multiplayer mode, both supporting the Wii Zapper peripheral on the WiiWare version.

=== Black Arms ===
Heavy Fire: Black Arms
- Developer: Teyon
- Publisher: Teyon
- Platforms: Wii (WiiWare), Nintendo 3DS (eShop)
- Release: WiiWare: NA: 2011-03-07; Nintendo 3DS eShop: WW: 2013-08-15
- Genres: Shooter, Arcade, Action
- Modes: Single-player, multiplayer

Heavy Fire: Black Arms is an on-rails arcade shooter and a sequel to Heavy Fire: Special Operations developed by Teyon. It was released in North America on March 7, 2011 for the WiiWare download service. An updated version for the Nintendo 3DS, called Heavy Fire: Black Arms 3D, was released on August 15, 2013, which is akin to its prequel Heavy Fire: Special Operations 3D being a re-release for the Nintendo eShop on the Nintendo 3DS in 2012.

A gameplay screenshot of Heavy Fire: Black Arms presenting a co-operative multiplayer mode

Heavy Fire: Black Arms is a shooting game set in South America where players are sent as special forces recruits to stop an illegal arms trade. As in the previous game a player starts the game as a Private equipped with a pistol and his goal is to eliminate opponents and gain as many points as possible to advance in the military hierarchy. Players can get several bonuses and perform combos like ‘Leader Kill’, ‘Demolition Man’, ‘Lord of Destruction’ and others, helping to achieve a higher score. Missions can be run using the light-gun from the ground, Humvee or boats. Players can also interact with new destructible objects with various destruction levels and splash damage effects. The game provides a player with 6 high-risk missions.

There are 6 ranks to achieve: Private First Class, Corporal, Sergeant, Staff Sergeant, Master Sergeant and Sergeant Major. They are linked to 7 specific guns, so the more points are gathered, the better the weapon can be used. The game provides a single-player and a co-operative multiplayer mode, both supporting the Wii Zapper peripheral on the WiiWare version.

Reviews for this game were mostly negative. Heavy Fire: Black Arms received an overall score of 7/10 from Gameplay Today. Nintendo Life gave the game a 3/10, claiming while it makes a good first impression it remains overall a sub-par rail shooter that does not offer anything more than an attractive price, whilst "the few tweaks [that] help elevate the game ever-so-slightly above its predecessor, they're not near enough: the gameplay is still as basic as the genre will tolerate and really needs more fundamental changes in order to justify its existence."

=== Afghanistan ===
Heavy Fire: Afghanistan
- Developer: Teyon
- Publisher: Mastiff
- Platforms: Wii; PlayStation 3 Microsoft Windows; Nintendo 3DS
- Release: November 18, 2011 (PS3/Wii); November 29, 2011 (PC); December 19, 2011 (3DS)
- Genres: Shooter, Arcade, Action

Heavy Fire: Afghanistan is an on-rails arcade shooter developed by Teyon and published by Mastiff. It was released for PlayStation 3, Microsoft Windows, Nintendo 3DS, and Wii in 2011.

The Nintendo 3DS version was retitled Heavy Fire: The Chosen Few.

=== Shattered Spear ===
Heavy Fire: Shattered Spear
- Developer: Teyon
- Publisher: Mastiff
- Platforms: Xbox 360; PlayStation 3; PC
- Release: January 29, 2013
- Genre: on-rails shooter
- Modes: Single-player, Multiplayer

Heavy Fire: Shattered Spear is a video game and the sequel to Heavy Fire: Afghanistan, in which soldiers are sent after a captured spy who holds the plans to a secret Iranian nuclear weapons facility. Heavy Fire: Shattered Spear is a military on-rails shooter made by Teyon in 2013 for the Xbox 360, PlayStation 3, and PC.

The Official Xbox Magazine gave the Xbox 360 version of the game a 25/100 saying, "It's as maddening and absurdly designed as it sounds, and even the simple local co-op play — which allows four reticles onscreen at once — isn't enough to make Heavy Fire appealing." The Official Xbox Magazine UK gave the Xbox 360 version of the game a 20/100 saying, "A masterclass in bad design. [Apr 2013, p.85]"

=== Red Shadow ===
Heavy Fire: Red Shadow
- Developer: Anshar
- Publisher: Mastiff
- Platforms: Xbox One; PlayStation 4; PS VR; PC
- Release: October 16, 2018
- Genre: on-rails shooter
- Mode: Single-player

Heavy Fire: Red Shadow is a video game and the sequel to Heavy Fire: Shattered Spear, in which the player is mounted behind a powerful turret-mounted machine gun. The game has a 360° view and the user has the option of calling in air strikes.
