= Hunter: The Reckoning – Deathwish =

Upcoming video game

- Developer: Teyon
- Publisher: Nacon
- Director: Piotr Łatocha
- Series: Hunter: The Reckoning
- Engine: Unreal Engine 5
- Platforms: PlayStation 5; Windows; Xbox Series X/S
- Release: Mid 2027
- Genre: Action role-playing
- Mode: Single-player

Hunter: The Reckoning – Deathwish is an upcoming action role-playing video game developed by Teyon and published by Nacon for PlayStation 5, Windows and Xbox Series X/S. Set in the World of Darkness universe, the game is based on the tabletop role-playing game Hunter: The Reckoning. It is scheduled for release in mid 2027.

== Gameplay ==
Players create and customize their own hunter through a character creation system, allowing them to tailor their appearance, abilities, and approach to missions.

The game features multiple ways to complete objectives, including stealth, dialogue, investigation, and direct combat. Decisions made throughout the story influence character relationships, mission outcomes, and the overall narrative. As ordinary humans confronting supernatural threats, players must rely on preparation, specialized equipment, and knowledge rather than supernatural powers to survive encounters with monsters lurking within modern society, including vampires and werewolves.

== Plot ==
The game is set in a dark and secretive version of New York City, where supernatural creatures operate hidden from public view. The protagonist, haunted by a traumatic event from childhood, attempts to live a normal life until the unexpected return of an old friend forces them to confront a world they thought they had left behind.

After discovering the existence of vampires and other supernatural beings, the protagonist becomes a Hunter—one of the few humans aware of the hidden dangers that threaten humanity. Throughout the story, players investigate mysterious events, uncover conspiracies, and hunt dangerous creatures while making choices that shape the course of the narrative.

== Development ==
Before the announcement of Hunter: The Reckoning – Deathwish, an unintentional update to RoboCop: Rogue City revealed the existence of a Hunter: The Reckoning game. A few weeks later, on March 26, 2026, the game was officially announced during the Xbox Partner Preview presentation. According to game director Piotr Łatocha, the project aims to provide a deeper role-playing experience than the studio's previous titles, with a strong emphasis on player agency, investigation, and narrative choice. The developers have cited action role-playing games such as Vampire: The Masquerade – Bloodlines and Baldur's Gate 3 among their influences, alongside the television series Supernatural.
