= Steel Empire =

1992 video game

- Genesis box art
- Developers: Hot-B; Mebius (3DS, NS)
- Publishers: Sega Genesis; JP: Hot-B; NA/EU: Acclaim Entertainment (Note: Released under the Flying Edge brand name on the Genesis.); Game Boy Advance; JP: Starfish (ja); EU: Zoo Digital Publishing; Nintendo 3DS; JP: Starfish SD; NA: Teyon
- Composers: Noriyuki Iwadare; Yoshiaki Kubotera; Isao Mizoguchi
- Platforms: Genesis, Game Boy Advance, Nintendo 3DS, Microsoft Windows, Nintendo Switch
- Release: Genesis; JP: March 13, 1992; PAL: November 12, 1992; NA: 1992; Game Boy Advance; JP: May 13, 2004; PAL: August 12, 2005; Nintendo 3DS; JP: March 19, 2014; NA: July 31, 2014; EU: December 17, 2015; Windows; WW: September 13, 2018; Switch; WW: July 31, 2025
- Genre: Scrolling shooter
- Mode: Single-player

Steel Empire (originally released as Koutetsu Teikoku (鋼鉄帝国, lit. "Empire of Steel") in Japan, and otherwise known in various English materials as The Steel Empire or Empire of Steel) is a horizontally scrolling shooter released on the Sega Genesis in 1992. Versions for the Game Boy Advance and Nintendo 3DS were released in 2004 and 2014, respectively. The game was released on the Nintendo Switch at the end of July 2025.

Steel Empire is notable among shoot 'em ups for its unique aesthetic designs. Mostly low-tech in nature, with it being set in a late-19th century alternate world, the game's aircraft, weaponry, power-ups, environments, enemies and bosses are heavily stylized. Their design added strong steampunk elements to the style, themes and visuals of the game. Steam power, propeller-based aircraft, biplanes, dirigibles and heavily-armored steam trains with giant cannons play large roles as the game's protagonists and opponents.

The original leaked Japanese arcade beta version (now rare, with its source code believed lost), the Mega Drive version and the GBA remake were all critically well received.

== Development and release ==
=== Japan ===
Koutetsu Teikoku was a Japanese title developed by Hot-B, under lead game designer Yoshinori Satake. Satake originally began development of an arcade game in the late 1980s based around themes of steampunk aviation, inspired by anime such as Laputa: Castle in the Sky and Future Boy Conan. Explaining on why he wanted to do a steampunk-themed game, Satake said:

"The image I had for the world was one of outrageous and nonsensical science. People [in the late 19th century] didn't understand the limitations of the steam engine at all, and they thought that the steam engine could do anything. They wrote many blueprints [for things like] this. My idea for Steel Empire was to bring those designs to life. People back then thought there was an atmosphere in space, and that the Aurora Borealis actually existed in space, too. So I tried to express that in the last stage by having an atmosphere in the background, and I told the designer how people back then drew images of space with mist. Using that as our image, we designed the graphics of the final stage to have a colorful, Aurora-like mist even though its in space. So even in space the propellers on the planes are spinning, and since there's an atmosphere, there's smoke too."

=== The West ===
Originally, the Western versions of the Sega Genesis game were going to be published by Sage's Creation, titled as Battlewings. Instead, they were published by Flying Edge as Steel Empire (with minor variantions across PAL territories) in 1992. The in-game credits of the Western versions specify that the inspiration of the game came from the 1819 novel Imperio do Aceiro (Empire of Steel) by Caar H. Schitch, but there is no meaningful evidence that this book actually exists outside the game's universe.

Sega contracted well known cover artist Marc Ericksen for Steel Empire's retro steam era look, closely following the inventive creations battling onscreen (see above right), and requested him to specifically design and execute the battle scarred steel plate title block logo, which appeared as both the "Steel Empire" and "Empire of Steel" iterations.

== Plot ==
=== Setting ===
The game has a steampunk-inspired setting, during the year "18XX" of the "Age of Steel", "an age almost familiar". In the earlier game materials, this is explained as being the 19th century of an alternate history. However, in some later game materials, it is explained alternatively as a possible future scenario in which the world has been depleted of resources, forcing most of the world back to steam power. Most materials, including the original Japanese versions, hold the alternate 19th century explanation to be the case. In this "Age of Steel", mammoth, floating, steam-powered battleships cruise the skies and gigantic armored locomotives carry cannons the size of railway cars. A military coup has occurred in the world's largest city, Damd ("Dama" in Asian markets) and power-hungry dictator, industrialist and robber baron General Styron ("Sauron" in Asian versions) rules by brute force and military might, his Goliath-like defenses carrying armor-piercing missiles and lethal aerial mines. With none strong enough to stand up against him, Styron sets his vision of steel and steam on the whole planet.

=== The Republic of Silverhead and the Motorhead Empire ===
General Styron's Steel Empire is commonly called the Motorheads by both its subjects and its enemies. The name comes from the Empire's symbol: a blue-grey steel colossal head with a mustache that sometimes emits steam. The Motorheads have conquered and enslaved most of the world, but one small republic remains free: the Republic of Silverhead, located in Antarctica, beyond the Steel Empire's control. Some great minds have escaped Styron's tyranny and have moved there. Silverhead is ahead of its time in technology; whereas the Motorheads rely on steam power, dynamite, and coal burning with almost religious zeal, Silverhead has perfected sustainable energy, geothermal energy, and even cold fusion. If the wider world were to also harness the power of lightning and the atom, it could pose a threat to Styron's coal and steam-based status quo, and so the dictator wants all "abominations of nature" ended.

Silverhead have a small yet elite air force, whose symbol is a silver eagle with a star between its wings. Although dwarfed in number by the legions of Motorheads, Silverheads are renowned for both the advanced technology of their aircraft and the aerial skill of their pilots. The Silverhead air force is also feared for the "Imamio Thunder"—known as the "Lightning Bomb" to Silverhead's enemies—which is more powerful than anything in the Motorheads' arsenal. Silverhead are the last hope for freedom, and they alone have the will, and the weapons, to bring about the Motorheads' downfall.

=== Mission questline ===
The player is a Silverhead pilot, launched from their titanic-sized, airborne, propelled aircraft carrier "Rheinhalt", and has a choice of two different class of aircraft for each mission. The game begins with the Motorhead Empire attacking the mining city of Rahl, an ally of Silverhead in southern Patagonia, and the player is tasked with retaking it. Further missions will take the player into the vast subterranean (and partially submerged) caverns of Liedengel, where the Motorhead are gathering a surprise attack force against Silverhead; Sky District Zektor; and the foremost defenses of the Steel Empire—the heavily fortified Gardandi Islands, which lay in front of Damd, the Motorheads' capital city. The final assault occurs in the heart of the Steel Empire, the steampunk metropolis of Damd, and within the cavernous Germburn Fortress. Finally, after General Styron has launched himself into orbit via a space cannon, the player must pursue him and his flagship past the atmosphere and into space. Styron's flagship unfurls into a solar sail-powered, flaming leviathan, and the last battle takes place over the moon. If the player is victorious, Styron's ship is shown crashing to the moon, the credits play, and "The End" shows over a bleak lunar surface beneath the glowing Earth. The player's Silverhead craft is nowhere to be seen, however, leaving the fate of the protagonist unconcluded.

== Gameplay ==
=== General ===
Steel Empire is a multi-directional scrolling shooter. Gameplay is linear in that the player is restricted to flying in only one direction, and the player will meet enemies in a predesignated order. However, unlike many scrolling shooters, Steel Empire allows the player to fire from behind as well as ahead. Players are given a certain number of lives and continues, with higher difficulty levels granting more continues but with fewer lives per continue. If the player's ship's health is completely depleted a life is subtracted, with play continuing normally. If all lives are lost (including the "zeroeth" life) the player must use a continue, which will restart at either the beginning or midpoint of a stage depending on how far the player was when they continued; as such, the stages are divided into "A" and "B" sections for purposes of the high score table. Continuing also zeroes the player's score. When all continues are expended, the game is over.

=== Ammunition, Power-ups ===
Small blasts of explosive directed energy are used by the aircraft fighters of Silverhead as a form of standard, unlimited ammunition; although this is not greatly effective against the majority of the heavily armored forces of the Steel Empire and its allies, and is virtually ineffective against the bosses and mini-bosses. Players have the ability to collect power-ups by flying into them, although the best tend to be in hard-to-reach places, or in the center of enemy formations, or dropped by the bigger, and tougher enemies. These power-ups include:

- Different modes and strengths of firepower, larger and wider spreads of firepower, and combinations thereof;
- Heat-seeking energy, especially useful against the nature of your coal-burning, steam-powered enemy;
- Airborne, autonomous damage repair kits left around by Silverhead allies to "heal" your craft;
- Extra ships (lives);
- A bolt of electricity giving the Silverhead craft increased speed;
- Large numbers of experience points in the center of enemy formations;
- Small, unmanned, combat drones resembling miniature Silverhead aircraft to wing you. They are essentially firepower floating on propellers and gas balloons; however through magnetism they can make formation around your ship to cover you from hostile fire, can take some punishment, and can shoot where you shoot.
- Imamio Thunder, commonly known as lightning bombs, are what the Motorheads fear the most, for they are bewildered by its nature and have little defense against it in their ships made of steel and conductive metals. The Imamio is the most powerful weapon in Silverhead's arsenal, and therefore your most effective weapon against the forces of the Steel Empire. A large black orb which is fired from the player's ship vertically upwards, expanding and transforming rapidly to reveal a skull-and-lightning symbol, the Imamio quickly explodes a few dozen feet above. The explosion of the Imamio causes hundreds of extremely high-temperature, high-energy streaks of lightning to rain down that heavily damage any aircraft or ground-based enemy in the vicinity which is composed of conductive metals; the Silverhead crafts are designed with non-conductive materials to withstand such a bombardment. The Imamio can be used to clear almost all typical Steel Empire enemies from the screen, and is capable of wiping out entire Motorhead squadrons at once. However, it does not destroy entirely the more heavily armored bosses and mini-bosses, although it does still cause them significant damage. Due to the rarity of lightning bombs, they are best used with strategy, and sparingly.

=== Leveling ===
Steel Empire features a kind of leveling-up system; every three powerups increase the player's firepower strength by one level, up to a maximum of 20. If the player uses a continue, their level is retained and enemies will continue to drop powerups. Designer Yoshinori Satake explained that this system was designed to favor unskilled players by allowing them to level up more if they were stuck; it was originally planned to have 40 levels, but his superior pointed out that players did not need to be at level 40 to beat the game and most would never see it.

=== Enemies ===
Gameplay focuses on combat with enemy aircraft, ground units and other assorted enemies and obstacles through seven progressively harder levels, each containing one or more bosses, which must be defeated in order to advance to the next level. The levels also feature less powerful minibosses, which appear about halfway through each level. Examples of typical enemies include small, steam-powered planes with flapping wings; ground-based railway tanks armed with cannons; kamikaze Motorheads propelled on what are essentially giant fireworks; and steam-powered windmills that launch themselves into the air propelling missiles. The bosses and mini-bosses include larger and more heavily armored rare enemies such as flying ironclads, and gigantic, steampunk-inspired mechanical golems.

=== Player aircraft ===
As a pilot in Silverhead's air force, launched from Silverhead's giant, propelled, flying aircraft carrier "Rheinhalt", the player can choose to fly one of two classes of fighter aircraft. Both the Striker and the Z-01 are adaptable, as evidenced through the game; can become submarine, as evident in the third stage; and are even capable of leaving the atmosphere and functioning and sustaining their pilots for some time in the vacuum of space, as evidenced by the final stage.

==== Striker ====
One of the two options is the eagle-like "Striker" – a small, light, swift and maneuverable attack aircraft. As well as the standard energy-based ammunition of Silverhead aircraft to fire ahead and to the rear, the Striker will launch secondary blasts diagonally down towards ground-based targets, an advantage not shared with the other craft available. This qualifies the Striker for being more a ground-attack orientated aircraft. In the Japanese version, the Striker is called the Etopirika after the Japanese crested puffin.

==== Z-01 ====
The other option of craft available to the player is the "Z-01" or "ZEP-01"; the first line of the code being "Zeppelin", a reference to the fact the Z-01 is a form of rigid airship. Unlike most Zeppelins, however, the Z-01 does not rely on gas or wind for movement, but with advanced energy maneuvering rockets, and is significantly armored. Compared to the Striker, the Z-01 is larger, and therefore a bigger target, and is slower; yet is significantly tougher and more durable, being able to take more punishment from enemy firepower. The Z-01s specialty is aerial mines launched upward, which fall further away in a wide crest motion; this makes it more suited to skyward assaults than the Striker, and qualifies it as more of an interceptor aircraft. The Z-01 also has a bigger ammo capacity, being able to hold spinning bombs and bouncing bombs.

== Reception ==
Steel Empire saw successful sales in both markets, and acquired cult status in Japan, and to a lesser degree also in the Western world. Critical reception upon the 1992 Western release of the game was mixed. Computer and Videogames Magazine Issue 126 gave Steel Empire a score of 90%. Sega Power magazine gave the game an overall score of 54 out of 100 stating "The graphics are different, the aliens are different, the attack patterns are different but the gameplay’s exactly the same as other Mega Drive shoot-em-ups."

== Legacy ==
=== Game Boy Advance port ===
In 2004, a port of the game for the Game Boy Advance was released in Japan by Starfish Inc.(ja), made up of members of the original developer Hot-B, retitled Koutetsu Teikoku from Hot-B. In 2005, British-based software house Zushi Games – ZOO Digital Publishing brought this remake of the game to Western markets as Steel Empire for the GBA. The game features numerous modifications in order to function on the smaller screen of the Game Boy Advance, including alterations to some boss attack patterns.

=== Burning Steel ===
In 2012, in response to some calls for a new remake of Steel Empire, original Hot-B lead game designer Yoshinori Satake stated that it "would be great" if it could be made available on a modern, 7th generation console via online distribution, but a direct remake of Steel Empire is today unlikely. According to Satake, "the arcade and Mega Drive source code has been lost", and there have been technical difficulties in porting the game already due to some of the more idiosyncratic features of the Mega Drive version (such as cinematics, effects, bosses, music). However, in the same interview Satake said that he has intentions for a sequel being made when future funds become available to do so. Satake envisions it as a "grittier" game than the original, which he would call Burning Steel, explaining:

"To make a proper sequel I'd probably need more development funds than we had for the GBA version. But I want to do it. I have an idea for a sequel titled "Koutetsu Moyu" [something like Burning Steel, though its a bit of a play on words, since the 'yu' can also be read in this compound as "oil" or "fuel".] Steel Empire was a sepia-colored steampunk world, but this would be a dark, grey steampunk. I have an image for it like the old war movies Nihyakusan Kouchi, Senkan Yamato, and Zerosen Moyu. I'd like to take the dark grey atmosphere of those movies and make a steampunk world out of it, using color, but with a monochrome feel from the desaturated colors and such. I think that would be an original steampunk world, and I've been drawing up plans for it to submit to Starfish."

=== Nintendo 3DS remake ===
In August 2013, Starfish announced its intention to release another remake of Steel Empire, this time for the Nintendo 3DS handheld system. The 3DS version would take advantage of the handheld's 3D screen and feature additional graphic and difficulty improvements. The game was scheduled for release in Japan in December 2013, with no announced plans to port the game beyond Japan at the time. It was finally released in Japan on March 19, 2014. In July 2014, Nintendo itself announced that Steel Empire would be released by Teyon in North America for Nintendo 3DS as a download from the Nintendo eShop on July 31, 2014. In December 2015, it was announced that the same publisher would publish the title in Europe on Christmas Eve. This version was also released on Steam in September 2018.

=== Nintendo Switch port ===
In August 2022, it was announced that Mebius would be releasing the game for Nintendo Switch in 2023. The game was eventually released on July 31, 2025.
