= Rhapsody: A Musical Adventure =

1998 video game

- North American PlayStation cover art
- Developer: Nippon Ichi Software
- Publisher: Nippon Ichi Software: NA: Atlus USA (PS1)
- Director: Kōichi Kitazumi
- Producers: Sōhei Niikawa; Kōichi Kitazumi
- Designers: Sōhei Niikawa; Ryōji Nomura
- Artists: Ryōji Nomura; Noriaki Kitamura; Masayuki Aikawa
- Writers: Sōhei Niikawa; Kōichi Kitazumi
- Composer: Tenpei Satō
- Series: Rhapsody
- Platforms: PlayStation; Nintendo DS; Nintendo Switch; Windows
- Release: December 17, 1998: PlayStation; JP: December 17, 1998; NA: July 30, 2000 Nintendo DS; JP: August 7, 2008; NA: September 23, 2008; AU: March 26, 2009; EU: March 27, 2009 Nintendo Switch; NA: August 30, 2022; EU: September 2, 2022; AU: September 9, 2022; JP: August 29, 2024 Windows; WW: August 30, 2022
- Genre: Tactical role-playing game
- Mode: Single-player

Rhapsody: A Musical Adventure (Note: Known as Marl Ōkoku no Ningyō Hime (Japanese: マール王国の人形姫, Hepburn: Māru-ōkoku no Ningyō-hime; lit. "Puppet Princess of Marl Kingdom") in Japan.) is a 1998 tactical role-playing video game developed and published by Nippon Ichi Software for the PlayStation. It is the first installment in the Rhapsody series. A version for the Nintendo DS was released in Japan and North America in 2008, and in PAL regions in 2009. The game was released for Nintendo Switch as part of the Prinny Presents NIS Classics Volume 3 compilation (alongside La Pucelle: Ragnarok) in western regions, and for Windows as a standalone game worldwide in 2022. The game and series in general has seen much success due to it skewing to a younger audience. Hamster Corporation released the PlayStation version as part of their Console Archives series for the Nintendo Switch 2 and PlayStation 5 in July 2026.

== Gameplay ==
When starting a new game, the player can select a game difficulty (easy, normal, or hard), which affects how long it will take to finish the game. The player selects different places on the world map and encounters random encounter battles, such as in the Dragon Quest series. Unlike most role-playing video games, the player can save at any time, except during battle.

Rhapsody is a theatrical musical in regard to its presentation style, containing frequent cut scenes that are sung, rather than simply spoken and acted. Players are given the option of listening to the lyrics and voice-overs in Japanese, English, or muting them entirely. Hidden throughout the game are high-quality illustrations of characters, which can be viewed any time through the item menu.

Screenshot of a typical battle scene.

The battles are fought in a tactical role-playing game fashion, but unlike other games in this genre, the battles tend to last less than a minute, with the exception of boss battles, and require little tactics. This makes the game stand out in its genre and may have also led to its limited mainstream success with more hardcore players of the genre.

Cornet is the main character, but mainly offers support in battle, as puppets that are found throughout the game do most of the fighting for her. Kururu never actually fights in any battles in the original, though she does in the remake for the DS. Each character learns different skills as they level up, except Cornet (in the original only), who has attacks called Rewards. Cornet can blow her horn during battle to power up the puppets and gain appreciation points, which allow her to unleash these devastating techniques. Most Rewards are represented by foods, such as flan, cake, and candy.

Like in most tactical RPGs, each character has a certain move number and can attack at a certain distance. Most party members can only attack at close range, unless he or she has a long-range skill. Each character can also equip three accessories and use items. The game features some normal status problems (sleep, paralysis, etc.) like in most console RPGs, but has some original ones too, such as turtle and philanthropy. Each enemy also has an element (thunder, wind, earth, fire, water, dark, holy) and a weakness to the opposite element. Each element has its own set of spells, which can be used to take advantage of such weaknesses.

Unlike in most tactical RPGs, instead of gaining experience points each turn, all the characters get the same number of points at the end of battle. After earning enough experience points, the character will level up and become stronger and possibly learn a spell. There are also skill points, gained when a character strikes the finishing blow. The more of these points a character has, the higher his or her critical rate becomes. Inotium, the in-game money, is also won after every battle. Occasionally monsters will join Cornet after they are defeated. These monsters can then be used in battle, like puppets, and can use special monster abilities.

== Plot ==
=== Story ===
The game centers around the adventures of Cornet, a girl who can talk to puppets and has a magical horn that grants wishes, and Kururu, a puppet that has the heart and soul of a human. The majority of the game is about Cornet and Kururu trying to save Prince Ferdinand (whom Cornet is in love with) after he has been turned to stone by the self-proclaimed "most beautiful witch in the world". The witch, Marjoly, also has a crush on the prince and meant to put him to sleep, but messed up the spell and accidentally turned him to stone.

=== Characters ===
- Cornet Espoir: Cornet is the cheerful heroine of the game. She can sing, play the horn, and even talk to puppets; which most people cannot do. Cornet dreams of a passionate relationship and despises toads. She longs for a prince to sweep her off of her feet.
- Kururu: She is a puppet and Cornet's best friend. She follows Cornet throughout the game, often making humorous comments on her behavior. She likes cherries, and dislikes anything sour. Unlike other puppets, Kururu can move around on her own without the powers of Cornet's horn, and she can talk to other humans besides Cornet. She hides a deep secret, but for the better. Her weapon of choice is a paper fan (she is only playable in the DS version).
- Cherie: Cornet's mother, who is said to have been killed in an accident many years prior to the start of the game.
- Ferdinand Marl E.: The prince, and soon to be king, of Marl Kingdom. He often sneaks out of the castle to hunt or visit the city. Cornet has dreamed of him her whole life and falls in love with him after a chance meeting in the forest.
- Etoile Rosenqueen: She is Cornet's arrogant rival. Etoile often makes sarcastic remarks about Cornet. She is from a rich background and loves being the center of attention.
- Marjoly: A sexy witch who is the main antagonist of the game, but is hardly the typical evil mastermind bent on world domination. She lies about her age and often calls herself the most beautiful witch in the world. Marjoly is actually not very smart and her lackeys often insult her rather openly.
- Gao: One of Marjoly's lackeys. It is said that she has the strength to fight a dragon with her bare hands. Many characters mistake her for a man, including Cornet.
- Crowdia: Another of Marjoly's lackeys, she is very beautiful, but very narcissistic. She has large black wings, like a crow, and fights with a sword.
- Myao: Marjoly's third lackey, she appears to be a child. She often acts childish and selfish, and she can cast powerful magic to summon dragons.

== Development ==
Sohei Niikawa first developed the concept of Rhapsody shortly after he joined Nippon Ichi Software in 1996. At the time, the company was working on tabletop and mahjong games. Realizing a potential financial problem within Nippon Ichi, Niikawa devised the scenario and script for Rhapsody.

After deciding that the game should contain musical elements, which were influenced by Disney films, Niikawa recruited Tenpei Sato to write the music in May 1998. Having composed and performed musicals in the past, Sato composed the game's musical numbers. The music was recorded at Sato's home studio, where he upgraded it to include ProTools as well as recording booths. Despite the vocal booth at his studio being narrow and the recording sessions taking place during the summer months, Sato admitted that the cast sang their best. When he heard the English versions of the songs, he was able to "hear the styles of Disney and Broadway". Three albums have been released. The first, titled Marl Oukoku no Ningyouhime Original Soundtrack, was released in Japan by A'Zip Music on January 22, 1999, and contains 22 tracks from the game. The second, Marl Oukoku no Ningyouhime: Original Vocal Album, was released by KSS on February 24 of the same year and contains 8 vocal tracks. The third, Rhapsody: A Musical Adventure Original Game Soundtrack, was released in North America by Atlus on July 30, 2000 alongside the game.

Cornet's voice actress, Kahoru Fujino, admitted that she was surprised about the game being a musical RPG.

An English localization of the game by Atlus was scheduled for release in North America in May 2000, but was delayed to July 30.

== Release ==
After the first release of the game, a cheaper edition called The Adventure of Puppet Princess + 1 was published, which featured an art gallery, sound test, and a bonus CD. The North American release of the game had these features, but instead of the bonus CD was a soundtrack CD, with vocal and instrumental songs from the game. The third release (The Adventure of Puppet Princess (PSone Books)), did not come with any extra CD. There was also a Rhapsody calendar released.

=== Nintendo DS version ===
Rhapsody: A Musical Adventure was released for the Nintendo DS on September 23, 2008. The gameplay has been changed significantly, and the battles were changed to be similar to the ones found in the sequels. Kururu also engages in battle in this version of the game. Though extra scenarios from the third game in the series were advertised, translated, and given as the reason for the removal of the English song vocals, they were absent from the game. NIS America removed this content because of localization issues. Reports of glitches have also surfaced such as freezing.

== Reception ==
Reception

Aggregate scores
Aggregator	Score	
Aggregator	DS	PS
GameRankings	N/A	68%
Metacritic	67 / 100	N/A

Review scores
Publication	Score	
Publication	DS	PS
Electronic Gaming Monthly	N/A	6.67 / 10
Game Informer	5.5 / 10	6.75 / 10
GameFan	N/A	70%
GamePro	4/5	3.5/5
GameRevolution	C−	D+
GameSpot	6 / 10	5.9 / 10
IGN	6.6 / 10	7.3 / 10
Official U.S. PlayStation Magazine	N/A	3/5
Ação Games	N/A	6.5/10

Reviews for the PlayStation and DS releases of Rhapsody: A Musical Adventure were mixed. Adam Cleveland of IGN said the original PlayStation release "packs more wallop than some RPGs I've seen" and that the younger demographic "will have a blast with this beginner's RPG". Miguel Lopez of GameSpot praised the PlayStation version for being a "nonconventional production". Johnny Liu of Game Revolution had mixed feelings on the original release, calling it "average to sub-average game from a gameplay perspective, but it pretty much falls flat everywhere else".

== Legacy ==
Rhapsody: A Musical Adventure has two sequels, Rhapsody II: Ballad of the Little Princess and Rhapsody III: Memories of Marl Kingdom.

Rhapsody's influence has extended into Nippon Ichi's subsequent series of tactical role-playing games. One of the characters of La Pucelle: Tactics is a descendant of the characters in the game, while the shops named after Cornet's rival, Etoile Rosenqueen, have spread even to the Netherworlds of Disgaea: Hour of Darkness. Antiphona no Seikahime: Tenshi no Gakufu Op.A takes place in the same world and features Marjoly, who also appears in Disgaea 3: Absence of Justice as DLC (and like all other DLC, is included with the Vita port, Absence of Detention, for free) and makes cameo appearances in each game of the Disgaea series.

== See also ==
- Cultural differences in role-playing video games
