= Rhapsody (video game series) =

Role-playing video game series

- Genre: Role-playing
- Developer: Nippon Ichi Software
- Publisher: Nippon Ichi Software
- First release: Rhapsody: A Musical Adventure; December 17, 1998
- Latest release: Rhapsody: Marl Kingdom Trilogy; August 29, 2024

Rhapsody (Note: Known as Marl Kingdom (Japanese: マール王国, Hepburn: Māru Ōkoku) in Japan.) is a series of role-playing video games developed by Nippon Ichi Software. The three main games in the series are Rhapsody: A Musical Adventure, Rhapsody II: Ballad of the Little Princess, and Rhapsody III: Memories of Marl Kingdom.

The first two games were released on the PlayStation, whereas the latter was for the PlayStation 2. Until 2023, only Rhapsody was translated to English, and was published by Atlus in 2000. The other two games' scripts have been translated to English by fans. Rhapsody II: Ballad of the Little Princess and Rhapsody III: Memories of Marl Kingdom were released as part of Rhapsody: Marl Kingdom Chronicles in August 2023. All three titles were eventually ported to PC via Microsoft Windows, Nintendo Switch and PlayStation 5.

== Characteristics ==
Like most Nippon Ichi games, the Rhapsody games feature bright, anime influenced graphics. All the games use 2D backgrounds and sprites, with the exception of Memories of Marl Kingdom, which has 3D backgrounds with 2D sprites. Each of the games were created by Yoshitsuna Kobayashi and feature the artwork of Yoshiharu Nomura, whereas the music was composed by Tenpei Sato, a regular for handling Nippon Ichi games. Sato described Rhapsody's music as a "complete musical with both solos and choruses" and said that it was a fun and refreshing experience.

The Rhapsody games, similar to other Nippon Ichi video games, feature goofy senses of humor, tongue-in-cheek melodrama, and quirky casts of heroes and villains. For instance, Cornet, in Rhapsody, attacks enemies with monstrous storms of confectionery foods, while her rival, the seemingly polite Etoile, pulls out machine guns on her enemies. Along with the humor, there is a certain level of girlishness to each game, the plot often focusing on issues of love rather than complex politics and demon lords. Each game also features musical numbers.

Each of the Rhapsody video games, with the exception of the puzzle games, are role-playing video games. Rhapsody and Little Princess are geared to be simpler RPGs, focusing more on story than complex gameplay, while Memories of Marl Kingdom's gameplay has more depth in it.

== Games ==
Release timeline
1998	Rhapsody: A Musical Adventure
1999	Rhapsody II: Ballad of the Little Princess
2000	Rhapsody III: Memories of Marl Kingdom
2001	Marl Kingdom: Happy Hunt
2001	Marl de Jigsaw
2002
2003	Marl Jong!!
2004–2022
2023	Rhapsody: Marl Kingdom Chronicles
2024	Rhapsody: Marl Kingdom Trilogy

=== Rhapsody: A Musical Adventure ===
Rhapsody: A Musical Adventure (titled Marl Kingdom: The Adventure of the Puppet Princess in Japan) was the first Marl Kingdom game. It was released on PlayStation on December 17, 1998, in Japan and on July 30, 2000, in the USA and was remade for the Nintendo DS in 2008. The game became an instant cult classic among fans and never gained much popularity in the mainstream. This game was also one of the first Nippon Ichi games to feature the anime art style and to have an offbeat sense of humor that has become a staple for the games Nippon Ichi has released.

In this game, Cornet, a young puppeteer, and her puppet friend Kururu face off against the almost menacing Marjoly and her minions in a battle over the prince. Battles are fought in a tactics fashion. This is the only Marl game to use this style. There are also a few musical numbers featured in the game, sung by various characters.

This title was released onto Nintendo Switch by NIS America as a bundle with La Pucelle: Ragnarok as Prinny Presents NIS Classics Volume 3: La Pucelle: Ragnarok / Rhapsody: A Musical Adventure - Deluxe Edition, and as a standalone title on Steam. A Rhapsody: Marl Kingdom Trilogy Deluxe Edition collection featuring all three Rhapsody titles and their respective DLCs is also available on Steam.

=== Rhapsody II: Ballad of the Little Princess ===
Rhapsody II: Ballad of the Little Princess (titled Little Princess: Puppet Princess of the Marl Kingdom 2 in Japan) was the second in the series. It was released on November 25, 1999, and was only released in Japan for the PlayStation. Like the game before it, Little Princess was released three times.

After Rhapsody, Cornet and her prince have a child and call her Kururu, after Cornet's friend. The game follows Kururu's adventures. Little Princess dumps the tactics battles for a more traditional RPG system. Musical numbers are also included.

Little Princess is also the first of the Marl series to be featured for download via the PlayStation Store in Japan. The download became available on May 31, 2007. This version can be played on either the PSP or PlayStation 3.

This title was released with Rhapsody III as a bundle under the title Rhapsody: Marl Kingdom Chronicles onto Nintendo Switch, and as a standalone title on Steam on August 29, 2023. A Rhapsody: Marl Kingdom Trilogy Deluxe Edition featuring all three Rhapsody titles and their respective DLCs are also available on Steam.

=== Rhapsody III: Memories of Marl Kingdom ===
Rhapsody III: Memories of Marl Kingdom (titled Angel's Present: A Marl Kingdom Story in Japan) is the third game in the Rhapsody series. It was released on December 21, 2000, in Japan for the PS2. This was the only main Marl game to be released on the PS2 and was the last Rhapsody game, and unlike the other two games, Memories of Marl Kingdom was released only once. Upon release, there was a limited-edition version.

Memories of Marl Kingdom, instead of focusing on just one story, is broken up into chapters similar to Dragon Quest IV, each with its own story and characters, including ones from previous games. The battle system recycles the traditional RPG one, adding the ability to have characters on the side lines, aiding the main party.

This title was released onto Nintendo Switch as a bundle under the title Rhapsody: Marl Kingdom Chronicles with Rhapsody II and as a standalone title on PC via Steam on August 29, 2023. A Rhapsody: Marl Kingdom Trilogy Deluxe Edition featuring all three Rhapsody titles and their respective DLCs is also available on Steam.

=== Marl Kingdom: Happy Hunt ===
Marl Kingdom: Happy Hunt is considered a minor sequel to Rhapsody: A Musical Adventure. It is a Japanese-only mobile web game released on June 4, 2001, and ran until its discontinuation in 2005.

=== Rhapsody: Marl Kingdom Chronicles ===
Rhapsody: Marl Kingdom Chronicles is a compilation of Rhapsody II: Ballad of the Little Princess and Rhapsody III: Memories of Marl Kingdom released for the Nintendo Switch, PlayStation 5 and Microsoft Windows via Steam on August 29, 2023 in North America, and for Europe and Oceania in September. It is the first time that both titles received official English translations. The battle systems for both titles have also been overhauled.

=== Puzzle games ===
Two other Nippon Ichi games, Marl Jong!! and Marl de Jigsaw, featured Rhapsody characters. Marl Jong!! for the PlayStation, is a Mahjong game with Marl elements. Marl de Jigsaw, for the PlayStation 2, is a puzzle game, where the player must assemble jigsaw puzzles, along the lines of Pieces. Similarly to most games in Japan, games with Rhapsody characters could be played on cellphones.

=== Other games ===
Several games developed by Nippon Ichi are often considered to be part of the Marl Kingdom world, such as Disgaea: Hour of Darkness and Makai Kingdom. In particular, La Pucelle: Tactics takes place in the same world, but at a different time in history and location and features the grandson of Cornet. A grown-up version of Elly from Memories of Marl Kingdom also makes an appearance. Antiphona no Seikahime: Tenshi no Gakufu Op.A, a musical RPG for the PSP, also takes place in the same world. Players can travel to Marl's Kingdom, and Marjoly and the Nyankos make an appearance.

== Merchandise ==
The Adventure of Etoile Rosenqueen from Marl Kingdom is an "audio book" that chronicles the rivalry between Cornet and Etoile in between the first and second games which was released in 2006. Tenpei Sato composed the music for it and was only released in Japan.

RosenQueen.com, named after Etoile Rosenqueen from the Marl games, was an online division of NIS America that sells various games and merchandise concerning the NIS games. In late 2010, however, they closed down RosenQueen, and made the merchandise shop a generic part of the NIS site.

The series also has calendars, soundtracks, phone cards, novels, comics, and plushies.

== Reception ==
Rhapsody has retained a cult following, but remains mostly unheard of in mainstream video gaming. With an emphasis on girlish themes and musical numbers, Rhapsody gained little popularity with the gaming industry in America, but in Japan, the series went on to have two sequels and sold well. Examples such as the cellphone gaming indicate that the Marl series is treated just as any other RPG series in Japan, whereas more of an oddity in North America.

Other Nippon Ichi games such as the Disgaea series, which are sometimes considered to be part of the Rhapsody world, have gained a large amount of popularity in America, years after Rhapsody was released. These games continue with the humorous approach to story telling and feature similar sugary character designs.

== See also ==
- Cultural differences in role-playing video games
