= Rhapsody II: Ballad of the Little Princess =

1999 video game

- Box art
- Developer: Nippon Ichi Software
- Publisher: Nippon Ichi Software: WW: NIS America
- Director: Shinji Ikedo
- Producer: Sōhei Niikawa
- Artist: Ryōji Nomura
- Writer: Sōhei Niikawa
- Composer: Tenpei Sato
- Series: Rhapsody
- Platforms: PlayStation; Microsoft Windows; i-αppli; Nintendo Switch; PlayStation 5
- Release: November 25, 1999: PlayStation; JP: November 25, 1999 i-αppli; JP: December 18, 2006 Microsoft Windows; WW: August 30, 2023 Nintendo Switch, PlayStation 5; NA: August 29, 2023; EU: September 1, 2023; JP: August 29, 2024
- Genre: Role-playing
- Mode: Single-player

Rhapsody II: Ballad of the Little Princess (Note: Known as Little Princess: Marl Ōkoku no Ningyō Hime 2 (Japanese: リトルプリンセス マール王国の人形姫2, Hepburn: Ritoru Purinsesu Māru Ōkoku no Ningyō Hime Tsū; lit. "Little Princess: Puppet Princess of Marl Kingdom 2") in Japan.) is a 1999 role-playing video game developed and published by Nippon Ichi Software for the PlayStation. It is the second installment in the Rhapsody series. The game takes place twelve years after the event of its predecessor, Rhapsody: A Musical Adventure, and features much of the same characters. Like its predecessor, Little Princess includes many musical interludes and focuses on the themes of falling in love and fulfilling your dreams, though the tactical role-playing game battle system of Rhapsody was discarded for a more traditional RPG battle system.

The game received several re-issues in Japan: twice as a budget range title on the original PlayStation and once each as a digital download for PlayStation Portable, PlayStation 3 and i-αppli-compatible mobile phones. The game received an international release in August 2023. It was released as a stand-alone title for Windows PC via Steam and as part of the Rhapsody: Marl Kingdom Chronicles compilation, along with its follow-up Rhapsody III: Memories of Marl Kingdom, for the Nintendo Switch and PlayStation 5. Hamster Corporation released the PlayStation version as part of their Console Archives series for the Nintendo Switch 2and PlayStation 5 in August 2026.

== Plot ==
Little Princess starts off many years after where Rhapsody: A Musical Adventure left off. Cornet, having saved Prince Ferdinand in Rhapsody, is now the ruler of Marl Kingdom. They have one daughter, Kururu, named after Cornet's fairy puppet friend/mother. Now twelve years old, Kururu, joined by her best friend Crea Rosenqueen, wants to go on a journey to find her own knight in shining armor.

While taking a walk through the forest, Kururu and Crea are attacked by a dragon and saved by a mysterious boy named Cello, much like how Cornet and Ferdinand met years before. Kururu does not immediately fall in love with Cello (mostly because he calls her "Pumpkin Pants" after her taste in clothing), and initially hates him. Over the course of her quest he repeatedly appears out of nowhere to help her.

Elsewhere, a battle is brewing between the two families of the witches — the Marjoly Family (the villains of the first game) and the Akurjo Family. The Akurjo Family is attempting to steal the Shadow of Beauty, a wish-granting gemstone that Marjoly has always treasured (as it is a memento of her first love, Keeldear). To keep the Akurjo Family from taking the jewel, Marjoly breaks it into pieces and scatters the shards across the country. Both of the witch families then begin searching for the shards, each trying to complete the gem first. Kururu, Crea, and Cello are soon involved with the search as well, as Cello needs the Shadow of Beauty to heal his mother's illness. As they work together, Kururu realizes that she is falling in love with Cello.

Once the pieces have all been collected, Kururu gathers the courage to confess her feelings to Cello. The moment she does, it is revealed that Cello's mother is Akurjo, who subsequently teleports away with him.

Kururu, determined not to give up on Cello, battles her way through Akurjo's castle to find Cello. Upon meeting him again, Cello tries to fight Kururu, but finally admits that he loves Kururu as well. He then collapses. Marjoly uses her magic to let Kururu enter Cello's heart to heal him. In this way, Kururu gets to experience his tragic past firsthand.

After the final battle with Akurjo, everyone (including the Marjoly Family) wishes together on the Shadow of Beauty for Akurjo to be healed of her illness. This succeeds, but Akurjo retreats into the Netherworld, saying she needs to cool her head (though Marjoly points out that Akurjo wants to say "thank you", and is just too stubborn to do so). Cello decides to go to the Netherworld to look after his mother, but promises Kururu that he will someday return to her.

Four years later, Kururu and Crea take a walk in the forest (just as they did at the beginning of the game), and again, Cello appears to save them from a dragon.

The game ends there and its story continues in the second chapter of Rhapsody III: Memories of Marl Kingdom.

== Characters ==
- Princess Kurusale Cherie Marl Q (クルセイル・シェリー・マール・Q, Kuruseiru Sherī Māru Kyū), a.k.a. Kururu (クルル, Kururu), is the game's protagonist and the daughter of Cornet and Ferdinand. She has a tendency to sneak out of the castle instead of studying, and is identified by the other characters as a tomboy. She has known Crea since they were children. According to Memories of Marl Kingdom, she later becomes famous throughout her kingdom as the 'Pumpkin Princess', because her trousers resemble a pumpkin. These trousers are often a source of humour, as some characters refer to her as 'pumpkin pants' to tease her.
- Createur Rosenqueen (クレアトゥール・ローゼンクイーン, Kureatūru Rōzenkuīn), commonly known as Crea (クレア, Kurea), is Etoile Rosenqueen's adoptive daughter, although at the start of the game she is unaware of her adoption. In a flashback at one point, it is shown that when Crea was young, the other children often picked on her, teasing her because she did not have a father. However, the first time she met Kururu, the latter saved her by fighting off the bullies. The two of them became very close friends after that.
- Cello (チェロ, Chero) is Kururu's main love interest, although he is initially not very friendly to her. Near the beginning of the game, Cello occasionally appears to give her cryptic advice and help her. He takes on a larger role after the birthday party of Queen Siegrind, during which he sneaks into the castle and attempts to steal the five treasures that act as a key to Beauty Castle (the home of Marjoly and the Shadow of Beauty). He explains that he needs the Shadow of Beauty to heal his ailing mother, who has a terminal illness. His 'mother' is Akurjo, by adoption. Near the end of the game, Kururu has a vision of the distant past, and through this the player learns Cello's history. It is explained that his parents died in a war with a neighbouring country, and he ended up becoming friends with Kururu's grandmother, Cherie (although, because Cherie and Cello are time travellers, these events are transpiring long before the birth of Kururu's grandfather). When destruction of the Ancient race seemed imminent, Cherie and Cello tried to use the Light of Beauty (a wish-granting jewel related to the Shadow of Beauty) to escape to the future. However, Cello was very anxious over the future, and so his wish was not as strong as Cherie's; they ended up in completely different time periods. Soon after Cello's arrival in the future, he met Akurjo, who decided to adopt him, apparently with the intention of manipulating him for her own purposes.
- Randy (ランディ・ラフィーネ, Randi Rafīne) is a knight who works at the castle. He became a knight in order to become stronger after the death of his little sister, since he felt guilty over not being able to protect her. Although Sonia considers him to be weak and often scolds him, he secretly loves her. In the second chapter of Memories of Marl Kingdom, he is engaged to Sonia, and as of the sixth chapter of the same game, they are married and expecting their first child.
- Sonia Francis Zeolight (ソニア・フランセーズ・ゼオライト, Sonia Furansēzu Zeoraito) is a female knight and Geo's daughter. She is popular amongst the people of Mothergreen, particularly the women, and possesses her own fan club, but shows little interest in romance. Though she treats Kururu strictly, some of her thoughts and flashbacks indicate that Sonia does care about Kururu, and that she wants for the princess to grow up properly and follow her dreams. This is partially because Sonia feels that her own dream (succeeding her father as a knight) was difficult to realise, and that one can't be pampered if they are trying to achieve something. In the second chapter of Memories of Marl Kingdom, she is engaged to Randy, but financial concerns prevent them from holding the wedding until sometime after the end of the chapter. In the sixth chapter, Sonia and Randy inform Geo of Sonia's pregnancy, news he takes joyfully.

== Gameplay ==
Like Rhapsody, Ballad of Little Princess is an RPG. Characters join the party, level up, equip things, etc. The player controls Kururu around different areas. There are multiple difficulties, but the game overall is viewed as more challenging than Rhapsody.

=== Battle ===
Battle scene

The battle system has changed drastically from Rhapsody's tactics style fights. Ballad of Little Princess features a more traditional RPG, turn-based battle system, with the enemy characters on the left-hand side of the screen and the player characters on the right. Unlike the battle system in Rhapsody (in which one controlled the game's main character and three puppets or monsters), only human characters fight. Puppets are equipped to specific characters, and are used to cast magic; instead of MP (magic points), money is taken with each spell in small amounts. Furthermore, a character's equipped puppets receive experience in battle and level up at roughly the same rate as the player, regardless of whether they are actually used in battle. Each time the player uses a puppet, a note is added to the musical staff on the battle screen; when a full bar is completed, the number to the right of the staff increases by one and the notes are cleared, allowing the player to fill up more bars with notes. When enough bars have been completed, the player can use a variety of attacks known as "Rewards" (ごほうび, gohōbi), which subtract varying amounts of completed bars from the player's total. A predecessor of the Reward system was present in the previous game, but in Little Princess, one receives notes after using puppet magic (rather than after playing the trumpet to boost the puppets' statistics), since the central character of Little Princess cannot play her trumpet in battle. As only two of the game's characters are able to equip and use puppets, most human characters have special skills or techniques equivalent to magic, and one character is able to use monsters (which can be captured after battle, as in Rhapsody) in much the same way as puppets.

== Legacy ==
Along with Rhapsody: A Musical Adventure and Rhapsody III: Memories of Marl Kingdom, this game is part of the Rhapsody series. Little Princess maintains the emphasis on musical numbers and themes of love introduced in Rhapsody, as well as the anime inspired, bright graphics, which are used in several later Nippon Ichi Software games.

=== Soundtrack ===
A soundtrack for the game's music was released on March 8, 2000. The music, like in the other Rhapsody games, was handled by Tenpei Sato.

== Reception ==
On release, Famitsu magazine scored the game a 30 out of 40.
