= La Pucelle: Tactics =

2002 video game

- North American cover art
- Developer: Nippon Ichi Software
- Publishers: JP: Nippon Ichi Software; NA: Mastiff; PAL: Koei
- Director: Yoshitsuna Kobayashi
- Producer: Sōhei Niikawa
- Designer: Yoshitsuna Kobayashi
- Programmer: Yoshitsuna Kobayashi
- Artist: Ryōji Nomura
- Writer: Sōhei Niikawa
- Composer: Tenpei Sato
- Series: Rhapsody
- Platforms: PlayStation 2 PlayStation Portable; Microsoft Windows; Nintendo Switch
- Release: January 31, 2002: PlayStation 2; JP: January 31, 2002; NA: May 4, 2004; EU: April 1, 2005; AU: April 15, 2005 PlayStation Portable; JP: November 26, 2009 Microsoft Windows, Nintendo Switch; NA: August 30, 2022; EU: September 2, 2022; AU: September 9, 2022
- Genre: Tactical role-playing
- Mode: Single-player

La Pucelle: Tactics (Note: Known in Japan as La Pucelle: The Legend of the Maiden of Light (ラ・ピュセル 光の聖女伝説, La Pyuseru Hikari no Seijo Densetsu).) is a tactical role-playing game developed by Nippon Ichi Software for the PlayStation 2. It was released in Japan in January 2002, and in North America by Mastiff in May 2004. The game was ported to the PlayStation Portable in Japan on November 26, 2009 as La Pucelle Ragnarok. The Ragnarok version was later ported to Windows and Nintendo Switch as part of the NIS Classics Volume 3 in 2022.

== Gameplay ==
Combat in the game is on an isometric map of varying size and shape. Each battle begins with a set number and arrangement of enemies, a base panel and Dark Portals scattered randomly around the map. Combat takes place on a separate screen and involves the attacker, their target and adjacent friendly units. Attackers and targets have one chance to attack.

Dark portals are gates to the Dark World, releasing a stream of dark energy which runs in one direction until it meets a character, enemy or obstacle. Although obstacles stop the energy, the stream will be redirected in the direction faced by a character. A character facing opposite to a stream of dark energy will stop it like an obstacle. If left uncovered for several rounds, a dark portal will release a new enemy on the map.

Purification is La Pucelle members' ability to use the power of Poitreen. In battle, purification closes dark portals and converts monsters. When a dark portal is purified, the character's purification power is subtracted from the portal's hit points. If the purification power is greater, the portal is closed. If a stream of dark energy more than 15 panels long intersects itself it activates a miracle, a massive attack affecting the entire line and anything within the loop made by the energy. This purifies any dark portals within the loop. When converted, monsters join the party after they're defeated. Each purification increases the chance of a monster converting.

A monster which has joined the party can be trained. Training consists of actions chosen by the player from a randomly generated list after finishing a map. A trained monster can be used in battle or sent to the Dark World, where they are used in wars between the Demons.

Each level has a Dark Energy Index measuring its dark energy. Acts during battle (such as leaving dark portals unpurified, attacking allies and opening presents) increases dark energy, and purifying the map decreases it. When the Index reaches 100, a portal opens which can be used to enter the Dark World (a series of randomly generated levels full of enemies and dark portals). The strength of Dark World enemies varies; the higher the Dark Energy Index, the stronger the enemies.

The PSP release included bonus content such as playable characters from the Disgaea series and the ability to retain characters/equipment restarting the game to enjoy the different chapter endings without losing progress. It also featured a new storyline exploring what it means to become an Overlord.

== Plot and characters ==
La Pucelle takes place in a kingdom named Paprica. The story centers on a small church, the Church of the Holy Maiden, in the city of Pot a Feu. In addition to the normal role of a church it has a group of trained demon hunters, La Pucelle. Two of La Pucelle's newest members are Prier, a sixteen-year-old girl, and her twelve-year-old brother Culotte.

The Dark Prince, favored servant of the fallen angel Calamity, will reportedly rise to scourge the land. When the prince rises a warrior, the Maiden of Light, will challenge him and restore the balance of light and darkness. Prier hopes to be the Maiden of Light.

The game's story is divided into chapters. Each chapter has a number of endings, depending on information discovered by La Pucelle. Its characters are:

- Prier — apprentice Demon Hunter and the game's Byronic heroine.
- Culotte — Prier's younger brother, who tries to act more mature than his sister.
- Alouette — Prier and Culotte's teacher.

Left to right: Eclair, Prier and Culotte, with an Eringa, four years before the game.

- Croix - former freelance demon hunter who joins La Pucelle.
- Eclair — princess of Paprica and close friend of Prier and Culotte.
- Homard — leader of the Chocolat gang.
- Yattanya — former Chocolat gang leader.
- Chocolat gang — group of air pirates.
- Monya-Monya — pilot of the Chocolat pirate airship.
- Papillon — fairy with a crush on Homard.
- Father Salade — founder of the Church of the Holy Maiden and La Pucelle.
- Noir — head of the Church Of The Divine Mother, church of about two-thirds of Paprica's population.

Most of the names in the game are French. La Pucelle, "the maid", was a nickname given to Joan of Arc. Some names are religion-related (Prier, to pray and Croix, cross), some others are food-related (Salade, salad; Chocolat, chocolate; Homard, lobster; Eclair, éclair; and Mount Champignon, mushroom) and the rest are unrelated to either (Papillon, butterfly; Noir, black; Allouette, lark; and Culotte, pants).

== Release and censorship ==
La Pucelle: Tactics was released in North America with nearly every cross removed, included those on Prier and Alouette's clothing; the shape of Croix's gun and the spell animations (except holy panels) were altered. The Dark World was originally hell. Croix's cigarette was removed from his character portraits and sprites. Mastiff explained the changes in an interview with 1UP.com before the game's release; according to Bill Schwarz of the company: "There are well organized forces that work hard to punish software makers and sellers for what they consider religious transgressions. As a very small and brand new publisher without deep pockets we need to pick and choose our battles. Had we thought the crosses were meaningful we would have fought. But they weren't. And we'd much rather have the game widely available then [sic] face disappointed gamers who cannot find the title. It was the right decision, though as we grow as company we may make different calls in the future".

== Reception ==
Reception

Aggregate score
Aggregator	Score
Metacritic	PS2: 79/100

Review scores
Publication	Score
Edge	7/10
Electronic Gaming Monthly	8/10
Famitsu	33/40
Game Informer	8/10
GamePro	4/5
GameRevolution	B
GameSpot	7.5/10
GameSpy	4/5
GameZone	8.9/10
IGN	8.8/10
Official U.S. PlayStation Magazine	4/5

When La Pucelle: Tactics was released in Japan, Famitsu gave its PlayStation 2 version a score of 33 out of 40. Elsewhere, the PS2 version received "generally favorable reviews" according to the review aggregation website Metacritic.

== Legacy ==
Prier is a hidden boss in Disgaea: Hour of Darkness. In Disgaea, Prier (Priere in this game) is the overlord of an alternate netherworld. She appears again in Disgaea 2: Cursed Memories as a hidden boss, and in the PSP port Dark Hero Days she is a playable character. Prier is a downloadable character for Disgaea 3: Absence of Justice, Disgaea 4: A Promise Unforgotten, and Disgaea 5: Alliance of Vengeance.
