= Super Swap =

2010 video game

- Developer: Teyon
- Publisher: Selectsoft
- Platform: Nintendo DSi (DSiWare)
- Release: NA: June 21, 2010; PAL: January 7, 2011
- Genre: Puzzle
- Mode: Single-player

Super Swap is an action puzzle game developed by Teyon for the Nintendo DSiWare. It is available in the Nintendo DSi Shop for 500 Nintendo DSi Points.

== Gameplay ==
Gameplay screenshot

Super Swap is an arcade puzzle game with elements of a match-3 genre. Blocks fall from the top of the upper screen to the bottom of the touchscreen, one by one. A player has to use a stylus to click on blocks and to drag them in one of 4 directions. Dragging enables the player to swap blocks and as a result to remove pieces off the board by making 3-in-a row or more matches. Combos can be only achieved in a horizontal or vertical row. Objects can be swapped even while they are still falling. If blocks pile above the bottom of the upper screen, it is game over.

=== Modes ===
- Classic mode - after the first 30 blocks fall from the top, blocks will appear only when a player makes a swap or match.
- Speed mode - blocks are falling down from the top of the screen constantly and faster in each stage.
- Rows mode - the whole board is filled up with blocks and a player's task is to click on and drag rows or columns to make swaps.
- Death mode - blocks are falling down from the top of the upper screen all the time. The game ends and a player loses when blocks reach the top of the upper screen.

== Reception ==
Super Swap received an overall score of 8/10 from Nintendo Life and a 26/30 from wiiloveit.com.
