= 101 Shark Pets =

2010 video game

- Developer: Teyon
- Publisher: Teyon
- Platform: Nintendo DSi (DSiWare)
- Release: NA: July 5, 2010; PAL: January 21, 2011
- Genres: Pet-raising simulation
- Mode: Single-player

101 Shark Pets is a 2010 pet caring simulation video game developed by Teyon for the Nintendo DSiWare.

== Gameplay ==
Gameplay screenshot

101 Shark Pets is a simulation of raising a shark. Players look after a shark and keep its statistics as high as possible by taking care of its health and mood, developing its personality, playing games and training it.

=== Mini-games ===
The game contains several mini-games such as treasure hunting, chasing a boat, memory, jigsaw and race.

- Memory - a player's task is to find all matching pairs of cards that can be bought in the Pet Shop.
- Treasure hunting - a player uses a stylus to find a way in a bubble water to collect coins, avoid mines and to get to a treasure.
- Chasing a boat - a player steers a motorboat and tries not to let a shark catch it until time runs out.
- Jigsaw - a player's goal is to put together all pieces of a picture that can be bought in the Pet Shop.
- Race - a player uses a stylus to guide a shark through various obstacles.

== Reception ==
Lucas Thomas of IGN gave the game a rating of 7 out of 10, stating that the game would appeal to "any virtual pet fans out there", despite not containing any features that set the game apart from others in the genre.
