= Air Panic =

- Official key art
- Directed by: Bob Misiorowski
- Written by: Jace Anderson; Adam Gierasch
- Story by: Boaz Davidson
- Produced by: Boaz Davidson; Danny Lerner; Scott Putnam; David Varod
- Starring: Kristanna Loken; Rod Rowland; Barbara Carrera; Alexander Enberg
- Cinematography: Rasool Ellore
- Edited by: Marc Jakubowicz
- Music by: Serge Colbert
- Production companies: Nu Image; Martien Holding
- Distributed by: Velocity Home Entertainment
- Release date: 22 January 2002 (Russia)
- Running time: 91 minutes
- Countries: United States; India; South Africa
- Language: English

Air Panic (also known as Panic and Triumph in the Sky) is a 2001 American-Indian-South African action film directed by Bob Misiorowski, and starring Kristanna Loken, Rod Rowland, Barbara Carrera, Scott Michael Campbell and Alexander Enberg.

== Plot ==
On approach to Denver, Flight 1055 crashes into a skyscraper after the pilots lose control of their aircraft. This marks the third in a series of similar incidents. Federal Aviation Authority investigator Neil McCabe (Rod Rowland) discovers that all of the incriminated planes were equipped with a pioneering flight control chip made by the company Oxcellis. He suspects that the crashes may have been provoked by a hacker who has exploited a vulnerability in Oxcellis' mainframe computer and is now able to remotely take over every plane that uses their flight management system.

Hoping to thwart another disaster, Rowland lists impending flights using Oxcellis-equipped airliners. His attention is drawn to Flight 672, which is scheduled to travel from Milwaukee to Washington, DC on Independence Day. Positing that its symbolic route makes it the most likely target, he travels to its departure airport. As he is about to embark, the terrorist takes control of the aircraft and forces it to take off. With the help of an airport security guard and Flight 672 attendant Josie (Kristanna Loken), Rowland manages to catch up to the aircraft as it races down the runway and climbs onboard before it becomes airborne.

Due to more unforeseen interference, both Flight 672 pilots soon find themselves out of commission. Rowland and Josie must team up in a desperate effort to regain control of the plane and save its motley crew of passengers. Among them are Bernadette (Barbara Carrera), a famous TV actress, Walter (John Bishop), a businessman with a fear of flying, Zoe (Boti Bliss), who is afflicted with brittle bone disease, Philip (Gulshan Grover), a self-absorbed physician travelling with his family, and Ray (Billy Williams), who has an unresolved personal issue with the flight's other attendant, Maxine (Tereza Rizzardi).

Meanwhile, on the ground, the FAA team led by Keller (Tucker Smallwood) is hunting down the terrorist (Alexander Enberg), who calls himself Cain and plans to crash the plane into the Calvert Cliffs Nuclear Power Plant, wiping out much of the surrounding region.

== Cast ==
- Rodney Rowland as Neil McCabe
- Kristanna Loken as Josie
- Alexander Enberg as Cain/Wilson Rundle
- Ted Shackelford as Captain O'Kelly
- Barbara Carrera as Bernadette
- Scott Michael Campbell as Rudy
- Tucker Smallwood as Keller
- Billy "Sly" Williams as Ray
- John Bishop as Walter
- Boti Bliss as Zoe
- Gulshan Grover as Philip
- David Bowe as Co-pilot
- Tereza Rizzardi as Maxine
- Duke Stroud as General Roberts

== Production ==
Air Panic was the first of two transportation disaster action films successively made for Nu Image by the same creative team. The second was Derailed starring Jean-Claude Van Damme, which was shot eleven months later. There is a humorous reference to the upcoming film at the end of Air Panic, when two characters agree to avoid planes in favor of trains in the future, citing their safer reputation. The film was shot in the fall of 2000 at Ramoji Film City studios in Hyderabad, Telangana, India. The crew was primarily local, but some of the stunt and FX teams came from Nu Image's usual shooting locations of South Africa and Bulgaria.

Barbara Carrera had previously worked with Misiorowski and Nu Image on Point of Impact, a 1993 crime thriller shot in South Africa. Air Panic is the first film credited to Marc Jakubowicz as lead editor. The son of veteran Nu Image editor Alain Jacubowicz, he had already worked under his father on several films, including Misiorowski's On The Border and Shark Attack. The film's final answer print was delivered on 10 September 2001, on the eve of the terror attacks perpetrated against the New York World Trade Center and the U.S. Department of Defense headquarters.

== Release ==
In the wake of 9/11, similarities between the film's fictional crash footage and the real world attacks received minor media attention. To alleviate those concerns, the release of Panic (as it was then known) was delayed by a few months in most territories. Nevertheless, unfortunate coincidences could not be entirely avoided, such as when German-Swiss distributor Highlight Video released their retail version on the week of the attacks' one-year anniversary, which some customers found insensitive.

In the United States, the film's rights were acquired by DEJ Productions as part of a larger relationship with Nu Image. DEJ contracted Velocity Home Entertainment for a wide DVD and VHS release on 21 January 2003, and issued its own pressing in the stores of its parent company Blockbuster Video. Due to American audiences' particular sensitivity to the matter, those domestic releases carried a disclaimer on the back of the case, stating: "Production on this film was completed prior to September 11, 2001. Some viewers may find certain scenes in this movie to be disturbing."

Less controversially, the film's belated appearance in some markets gave it a small curiosity appeal, as Kristanna Loken was chosen to play the Terminatrix in the long anticipated Terminator 3: Rise of the Machines in February 2002. In the U.S., Loken's name was omitted from the box cover, even for the film's June 2003 reissue by Fox's budget label Key DVD.

== Reception ==
Air Panic was not discussed extensively upon release, and due to its low profile, some critics did not fully grasp the coincidental nature of its real-life parallels. Even when viewed on its own merits, the film received lukewarm opinions, earning moderate praise for its pacing and derision for its poor special effects. Ballantine Books' DVD and Video Guide called the film a "low-rent but tolerable, uneasy mix of Speed and current events".
