= Terminator 3: Rise of the Machines (video game) =

2003 video game

- European Xbox cover art
- Developers: Black Ops Entertainment (Note: Additional work by Shiny Entertainment, Legend Entertainment and Atari Melbourne House.); Taniko (GBA)
- Publisher: Atari
- Director: Jose Villeta
- Producer: John C. Boone II
- Designer: John C. Boone II
- Programmer: Kelly McCarthy Fitzgerald
- Artist: Nicholas deSomov
- Composers: Ric Formosa; Danny Beckerman
- Platforms: PlayStation 2, Xbox, Game Boy Advance
- Release: NA: November 11, 2003; UK: November 21, 2003 (GBA); UK: November 28, 2003
- Genres: First-person shooter, action Shoot 'em up (GBA)
- Modes: Single-player; Multiplayer (GBA only)

Terminator 3: Rise of the Machines is a 2003 first-person shooter video game based on the film of the same title, with elements of hand-to-hand combat in the third-person perspective. It was developed by Black Ops Entertainment, with assistance work done by other Atari-owned subsidiaries. The game was published by Atari for PlayStation 2 and Xbox in 2003. An isometric shooter version was released for the Game Boy Advance during the same year. The game was also going to be released for GameCube, but was eventually cancelled.

The PlayStation 2 and Xbox versions received "generally unfavorable reviews" according to Metacritic, with criticism of the graphics, fighting levels, and poor artificial intelligence.

Two other games, Terminator 3: War of the Machines and Terminator 3: The Redemption, are also based on the film and were released in 2003 and 2004, respectively.

== Gameplay ==
Terminator 3: Rise of the Machines follows the film's basic story. In the home console versions, the player plays the role of the T-850 and in some levels shoot their way through enemy cyborgs or drones with a selection of weapons such as assault rifles, rocket launchers or grenade launchers. There are levels that require the player to protect allied characters from armed enemies. There is also a fist fight sequence in some levels which engage the main character against either an enemy cyborg or the T-X, which is the main antagonist of the film.

The Game Boy Advance (GBA) version is a third-person shooter with 12 missions, played from an isometric perspective. The player takes control of the Terminator, and can use the machine's red-colored scan mode to identify hidden objects and people. The GBA version includes two multiplayer games. One game is a two-player co-op in which players enter a room and must kill enemies, before advancing to the next room to repeat the process. The other multiplayer game is capture the flag, in which up to four players use portals that transport them throughout a level while trying to capture an opposing team's flag. Both multiplayer games require the GBA Game Link Cable.

== Development and release ==
In July 2002, Infogrames announced that it had purchased the license to make video games based on the 2003 film Terminator 3: Rise of the Machines. Atari, an affiliate of Infogrames, announced the game in April 2003. The PlayStation 2 (PS2) and Xbox versions of the game were developed by Black Ops Entertainment, along with several companies which were owned by Atari. Legend Entertainment worked on the game's weapon models and effects, while Atari Melbourne House worked on the sound design. Shiny Entertainment worked on the fighting portions of the game.

The filmmakers wanted the game to be faithful to the film's story, while allowing the player to experience aspects that the film did not fully explore, such as the future war between humans and machines. Special-effects artist Stan Winston, who worked on the film, provided his designs to the Black Ops team. Arnold Schwarzenegger provided his voice and likeness to the home console game for its portrayal of the T-850. In addition, Schwarzenegger also starred in a live-action scene for the game that explains the origins of his Terminator character. The home console game also includes footage from the film, and Nick Stahl reprises his role of John Connor through voice acting. A version of the game had been planned for the GameCube, but its cancellation was announced in September 2003. Atari stated that there was insufficient time to continue development of the GameCube version.

The GBA version was developed by Taniko. Terminator 3: Rise of the Machines was published by Atari and released in the United States on November 11, 2003, for PlayStation 2, Xbox, and GBA. The release coincided with the home video release of the film.

Terminator 3 was the last project that Legend Entertainment was involved in before they permanently closed their doors the next year in 2004

== Reception ==
Reception

Aggregate score
Aggregator	Score
Metacritic	(GBA) 50/100 (PS2) 38/100 (Xbox) 35/100

Review scores
Publication	Score
Electronic Gaming Monthly	3/10
Eurogamer	1/10
Famitsu	25/40
Game Informer	(GBA) 7.5/10 (PS2) 5.75/10
GamePro	2.5/5
GameRevolution	F
GameSpot	(GBA) 4.8/10; 3.7/10
GameSpy	1/5
GameZone	(GBA) 5/10 (Xbox) 4.5/10 (PS2) 4/10
IGN	(GBA) 6.5/10; 3.5/10
Nintendo Power	3.4/5
Official U.S. PlayStation Magazine	1.5/5
Official Xbox Magazine (US)	4.6/10

The PlayStation 2 and Xbox versions of Terminator 3: Rise of the Machines received "generally unfavorable reviews" according to Metacritic. Several critics believed that the game felt rushed through development, and others noted the large number of people credited with creating the game, stating that this did not help translate to a good product.

Game Revolution called the game a "monumental catastrophe". Kristan Reed of Eurogamer wrote, "Rarely – if ever – have we witnessed such a painful licensing gaff, and the six or so hours we spent in the company of Rise of the Machines surely rank alongside the most painful we've endured in twenty odd years of videogaming." Reed stated that the game "drags the reputation of movie-licensed games back down to the gutter in truly disgraceful fashion". Michael Knutson of GameZone wrote that Terminator 3 "relies too much on the license and doesn't put enough effort into making the game fun." Alex Navarro of GameSpot stated "the story structure doesn't mimic the film's plot especially well, adding sections that aren't all that interesting and omitting many key areas".

The graphics were largely criticized. Navarro was critical of the game's "drab, nasty look" and stated that the game "manages to make a post-nuclear war zone look even worse than it probably should." Reed described some levels as "a series of rubble-strewn concrete environments, as grey, dull and lifeless as your worst nightmares could imagine." Game Revolution was also critical of the gray coloring: "Gray objects and gray robots fight in front of gray walls." Knutson opined that the game "looks bland, drab, and downright awful." A couple critics stated that the graphics of the Xbox version were slightly superior to the PS2 version. Marc Nix of IGN criticized the combination of CG cutscenes and film footage.

The gameplay was criticized for being too easy and for having a short overall length, with some critics stating that the levels become shorter as the game progresses. The game's targeting system received criticism as well. Game Revolution wrote that the system "seems to pick an enemy randomly, even if they are behind a wall, while someone else shoots at you." Andrew Reiner of Game Informer stated that while the game would appeal to Terminator fans, "Its gameplay is well below today's standard for console FPS." The fighting portions were criticized for their simplicity and limited combat moves.

The game was also criticized for various software bugs, with Nix writing that the game's "bugs and errors amp up the challenge of playing this game in all the worst ways." The collision detection was among errors criticized. GamePro wrote, "Many times, you'll have a target locked on to an enemy and your shots will pass straight through them. Enemy fire also goes through walls, which leads to many instances of getting shot by enemies you can't see." The artificial intelligence (AI) was criticized as well. Navarro called the AI "pretty horrendous" and wrote about the player's teammates, "When they aren't running straight into heavy walls of enemy fire, they're running into actual walls and getting stuck there." GamePro stated that when the non-playable characters are "not running into objects or enemy fire, they're not reacting at all, effectively eliminating them from the game".

Game Revolution enjoyed the music, while Nix felt that it did not fit in. Other critics were unimpressed by the music and sound, and Schwarzenegger's one-liner dialogue was criticized as repetitive.

=== GBA version ===
The GBA version received "mixed or average reviews" according to Metacritic. GameSpot's Alex Navarro considered it the best Terminator 3 game available, but stated that beyond comparison to the other games, "the game doesn't hold up on its own merits." Navarro believed that the game felt rushed through development. Jon Gibson of GameSpy also considered it the best Terminator 3 game to date, although he considered them all to be bad. Adam Tierney of IGN stated that it "is by no means a bad game. The design and presentation of this title is surprisingly ambitious. But like most licensed games, it's just too rough around the edges to be as effective and engaging as it should have been."

The game was criticized for its target aiming and for being too easy. Gibson stated that one reason for its ease of difficulty was the abundance of ammunition. Navarro complained that the game was too short in length.

The graphics were generally criticized, although Tierney praised the detailed backgrounds and character sprites, and stated, "The entire palette of the game oozes with the colors of futuristic doom". However, Tierney criticized the character movements, describing them as awkward and clumsy. Tierney praised the music, but had mixed feelings about the sound effects. Other critics considered the sound and music to be the best aspects of the game.

The multiplayer mode received a mixed response. Criticism went to the co-op mode, which was viewed as redundant. The "capture the flag" mode was also criticized for how easy it is to get lost, due to the use of the portals. Navarro called the multiplayer component "a nice idea" but stated that "the hasty and subpar execution of the mode essentially renders it useless." Gibson wrote, "I did find some solace in the multiplayer modes, however corrupted they might be," while stating that the modes "might be the only decent thing in this game." Tierney wrote "there is one fantastic thing this game has going for it, and that is multiplayer."
