= Terminator 3: The Redemption =

2004 video game

- Official box art
- Developer: Paradigm Entertainment
- Publisher: Atari
- Designer: Shawn Wright
- Composer: Cris Velasco
- Series: Terminator
- Platforms: PlayStation 2, Xbox, GameCube
- Release: NA: September 9, 2004; AU: September 17, 2004; EU: September 24, 2004
- Genre: Action-adventure
- Modes: Single-player, multiplayer

Terminator 3: The Redemption is an action-adventure video game based on the 2003 film Terminator 3: Rise of the Machines. Developed by Paradigm Entertainment and published by Atari in 2004, the game was released for the PlayStation 2, Xbox, and GameCube. Terminator 3: The Redemption received "mixed or average" reviews, according to Metacritic. While it was praised for its graphics and considered an improvement over an earlier game (Terminator 3: Rise of the Machines), the gameplay was criticized for being linear, repetitive, and difficult.

== Gameplay ==
Terminator 3: The Redemption features multiple gameplay styles presented from a third-person perspective across 14 levels, which are partially based on the film Terminator 3: Rise of the Machines while also expanding the film's backstory. The player assumes the role of a T-850 Terminator. Several levels are played on foot, where the player fights against other Terminators. The player can use various guns against enemies and engage in hand-to-hand combat. Additionally, the player can use detached road signs as weapons. The T-850's red-colored scan mode allows the player to deal increased damage to enemies, and points known as "Terabytes" can be collected throughout the game to upgrade this scan mode.

The game also includes driving levels featuring various vehicles, such as a hearse, a pickup truck, and a police car. Additionally, there are rail shooter levels where the player is in a moving vehicle and must shoot at oncoming Terminator enemies. The T-X serves as the primary enemy throughout the game, as in the film. A two-player co-op mode is included, where players must defend against oncoming Terminators in a rail shooter format.

== Plot ==
The story begins in 2032, where a squad of Tech-Com soldiers launches an assault on a Skynet facility to stop a T-X from using a time displacement machine. However, the squad is outmatched by the T-X's superior abilities, and they are all gruesomely killed.

Meanwhile, Katherine Brewster and the Human Resistance ambush the T-850 responsible for the death of John Connor. A Tech-Com technician reprograms the cyborg and sends it back to July 23, 2003 to protect the younger versions of John and Kate. With the help of several Tech-Com soldiers, the T-850 fights its way to the main gate of the Skynet bunker and enters the time displacement machine.

In the past, the T-850 rescues John and Kate from the T-X and informs them that Judgment Day will occur within hours. The plan is to acquire a plane from a nearby military base and fly John and Kate to Crystal Peak, a bunker where they can survive the impending nuclear blasts. Upon arriving at the base, the T-X reappears and knocks the T-850 into a prototype time machine, sending it back to a new, alternate future where Skynet has triumphed.

The Terminator fights its way through Skynet once again and returns to 2003 just in time to confront the T-X, allowing John and Kate to escape to Crystal Peak. At the bunker, the T-850 blocks the T-X's path to John and Kate, sacrificing itself by placing its damaged fuel cell into the T-X's mouth, causing a massive explosion that seemingly destroys both Terminators.

After Judgment Day, John removes the CPU from the heavily damaged T-850, deactivating it. The story then shifts to a later point in the war, where John is leading the Resistance. He uses the CPU to reactivate the Terminator, now revealed to have been rebuilt as an extensively modified FK Reaper. The Terminator strides into battle once more, aiding John Connor, as the game concludes with the final caption: "The battle has just begun..."

== Development and release ==
Terminator 3: The Redemption was developed by Paradigm Entertainment and published by Atari. It was developed simultaneously with another game, Terminator 3: Rise of the Machines, which was created by Black Ops. Both development teams took photos of the film set to assist with the games' creation. Black Ops' game was released alongside the DVD release of the film in November 2003, but Paradigm could not meet this deadline due to the larger scale of their game. Atari granted Paradigm additional time to work on Terminator 3: The Redemption. Paradigm had previously developed The Terminator: Dawn of Fate (2002), and the same concept team returned to work on The Redemption.

Despite the poor reception of Black Ops' Terminator 3 game, Atari decided to continue with The Redemption. Atari acquired the rights to use the likenesses of Arnold Schwarzenegger and Kristanna Loken, who portray the Terminators in the film. 3D scans of the actors were used to create their in-game counterparts. Paradigm also collaborated with C2 Pictures on enemy designs and story elements for the game.

Lead game designer Shawn Wright noted that working with a film license offered advantages, such as having an established universe and characters, but also mentioned the downside that content had to be sent to California for approval. The game features footage from the film. Some aspects of the game were influenced by Grand Theft Auto III, though the development team was careful not to create a GTA clone. According to Paradigm, 50 percent of the gameplay is vehicle-based, 25 percent involves rail-shooter action, and the remaining 25 percent is character combat. The fast pace of the game was intentional, with producer Josh Hackney stating, "We didn't want to take the gameplay and player control away from the player for more than five seconds."

One feature developed but ultimately removed from the final version was the use of mission timers. Initially, players were required to complete certain levels within a set time to progress. In the final version, however, timers were kept optional; players can complete missions at their own pace, but those who finish within the time limit receive rewards. The targeting system also underwent changes during development.

Schwarzenegger provided some voice work for the game, with the rest handled by soundalike Mark Mosley.

Development concluded in August 2004, and the game was shipped to North American retailers on September 9, 2004, less than 10 months after the release of the previous Terminator 3 game. In Japan, the game was released for PlayStation 2 and GameCube on January 20, 2005.

== Reception ==
Reception

Aggregate score
Aggregator	Score
Metacritic	68/100 (GC/PS2); 66/100 (Xbox)

Review scores
Publication	Score
Electronic Gaming Monthly	3.83/10
Famitsu	28/40 (GC)
Game Informer	8/10
GamePro	3/5 (Xbox)
GameRevolution	C
GameSpot	7.2/10
GameSpy	3/5
GameZone	7.4/10 (GC); 7/10 (PS2); 7.3/10 (Xbox)
IGN	7.1/10
Nintendo Power	3.8/5 (GC)
Official U.S. PlayStation Magazine	3.5/5 (PS2)
Official Xbox Magazine (US)	8.1/10 (Xbox)
The Sydney Morning Herald	3.5/5

Terminator 3: The Redemption received "mixed or average" reviews on all platforms according to the review aggregator website Metacritic. The game was seen as an improvement over the original Terminator 3 game, and some critics considered the "Redemption" title an appropriate one, with Alex Navarro of GameSpot writing, "the name The Redemption seems all too apt when describing this latest Terminator title, because it turns out that this one is actually pretty good."

Jeremy Dunham of IGN considered it the first good game in the Terminator series since The Terminator: Future Shock. Louis Bedigian of GameZone favorably compared the game's action to that of the Terminator 2: Judgment Day arcade game. Other reviewers for GameZone concluded that it was the best Terminator game yet. However, critics generally recommended the game as a rental rather than a purchase. GamePro wrote that "although Redemption has its moments, it merits a cautionary rental. Redemption gives some luster back to the Terminator name, but not much." Russ Fischer of GameSpy wrote, "Atari and Paradigm have put together a title that nails the tone of the source, without entirely capturing the appeal."

Praise went to the graphics, including the character models. Game Informer called Schwarzenegger's character "eerily perfect" in appearance. The Sydney Morning Herald stated that "The levels are so big and detailed that it's a wonder they don't bring your console to a crashing halt." Some critics believed that the graphics looked best on the Xbox version. The film footage featured in the game received some criticism for its low quality.

The gameplay was criticized as linear and repetitive. Some critics also believed the game lacked replay value. However, praise went to the variety of gameplay styles, which Dunham found to be "surprisingly addictive." Reviewers also criticized the gameplay for its trial and error element. The difficulty was criticized as well, including the lack of save points, forcing the player to start a level from the beginning if they lost. Eduardo Zacarias of GameZone wrote, "If there's a game that could have used a checkpoint, this is it." However, Dunham enjoyed the difficulty. Navarro stated that despite the difficulty, the missions "are usually good enough that you will want to keep coming back to try again." Some reviewers were critical of the game's targeting system, although Fischer considered it easy to use.

Critics praised the driving and rail-shooter levels, which were generally considered to be the best parts of the game. Mike Reilly of Game Revolution wrote that the on-foot levels "are a bit drab in comparison." GameZone writer Natalie Romano wrote, "it's the driving parts that keep this from being just a simple shooter". GamePro opined that the film-based levels were not as fun as those created specifically for the game.

The music and sound were praised, although GamePro considered the music to be monotonous. The voiceovers were also generally praised, although Andrew Reiner of Game Informer was critical of Schwarzenegger's "horrifying one-liners", and Navarro was critical of Schwarzenegger's substitute voice actor: "To say that this substitute actor is merely subpar would be something of an understatement. Fortunately, this is really the only blemish on the game's audio." GamePro stated that Schwarzenegger's "one-liners couldn't sound more uninspired", although Romano enjoyed them.
