= Kristanna Loken =

American actress (born 1979)

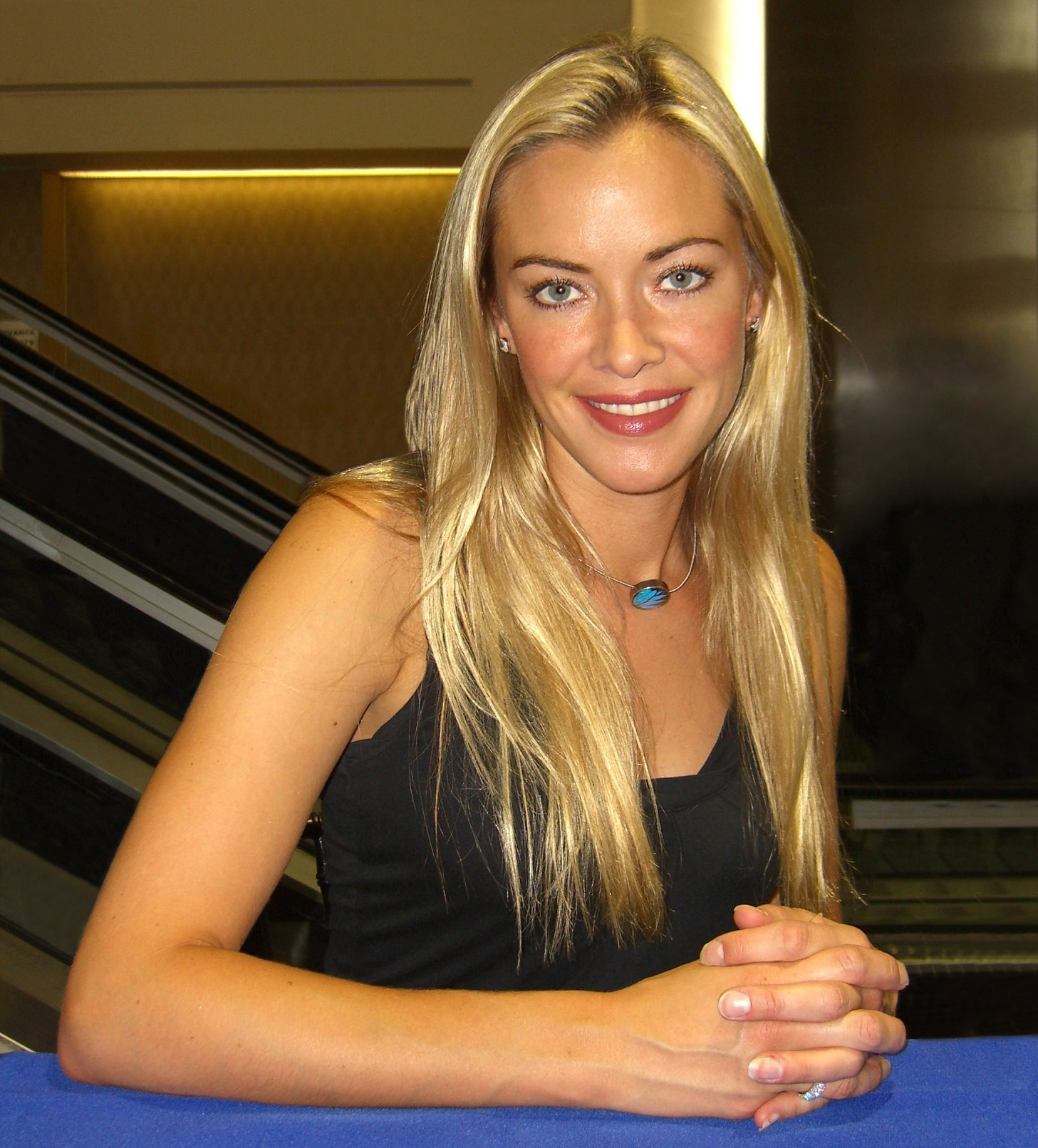
- Loken in 2011
- Born: Kristanna Sommer Loken; October 8, 1979 (age 47); Ghent, New York, U.S.
- Occupation: Actress
- Years active: 1994–present
- Known for: Terminator 3: Rise of the Machines; BloodRayne; Bounty Killer; Pensacola: Wings of Gold; Painkiller Jane
- Spouse: Noah Danby (m. 2008; sep. 2009)
- Children: 1

Kristanna Sommer Loken (born October 8, 1979) is an American actress. After her modelling career, in which she participated in the 1994 Elite Model Look at the age of 15, Loken started her acting career in 1994 as the third actress to play Danielle 'Dani' Andropoulos on an episode of As the World Turns. She later appeared in several television shows and films, such as Mortal Kombat: Conquest and Air Panic (2001). Her breakthrough role was as the gynoid T-X in Terminator 3: Rise of the Machines (2003), for which she was nominated for two Saturn Awards. She has since starred in films such as BloodRayne (2005), in which she portrayed Rayne, Bounty Killer (2013), and Darkness of Man (2024), as well as the TV series Painkiller Jane (2007), The L Word (2007–2008) and Burn Notice (2011–2012).

== Early life ==
Loken was born October 8, 1979, in Ghent, Columbia County, New York, to parents from a Norwegian community in Wisconsin. She is the daughter of Rande (née Porath), a model, and Merlin "Chris" Loken, a writer, apple farmer, and former Broadway and Hollywood actor. Loken has a sister named Tanya. Loken is of Norwegian and German descent from her great-grandparents, and her grandparents also spoke Norwegian. Regarding her ethnic heritage, Loken indicated in a 2003 interview that she calls herself both Norwegian and American, saying, "We follow many of the Norwegian traditions...the holidays, especially at Christmas. This is something I hope to keep going when I have a family of my own." In a 2006 interview she also mentioned German heritage, stating, "I do have Norwegian blood, with a little bit of German in there." She grew up in a town in Upstate New York, and took her first trip to Norway at age 12.

== Career ==
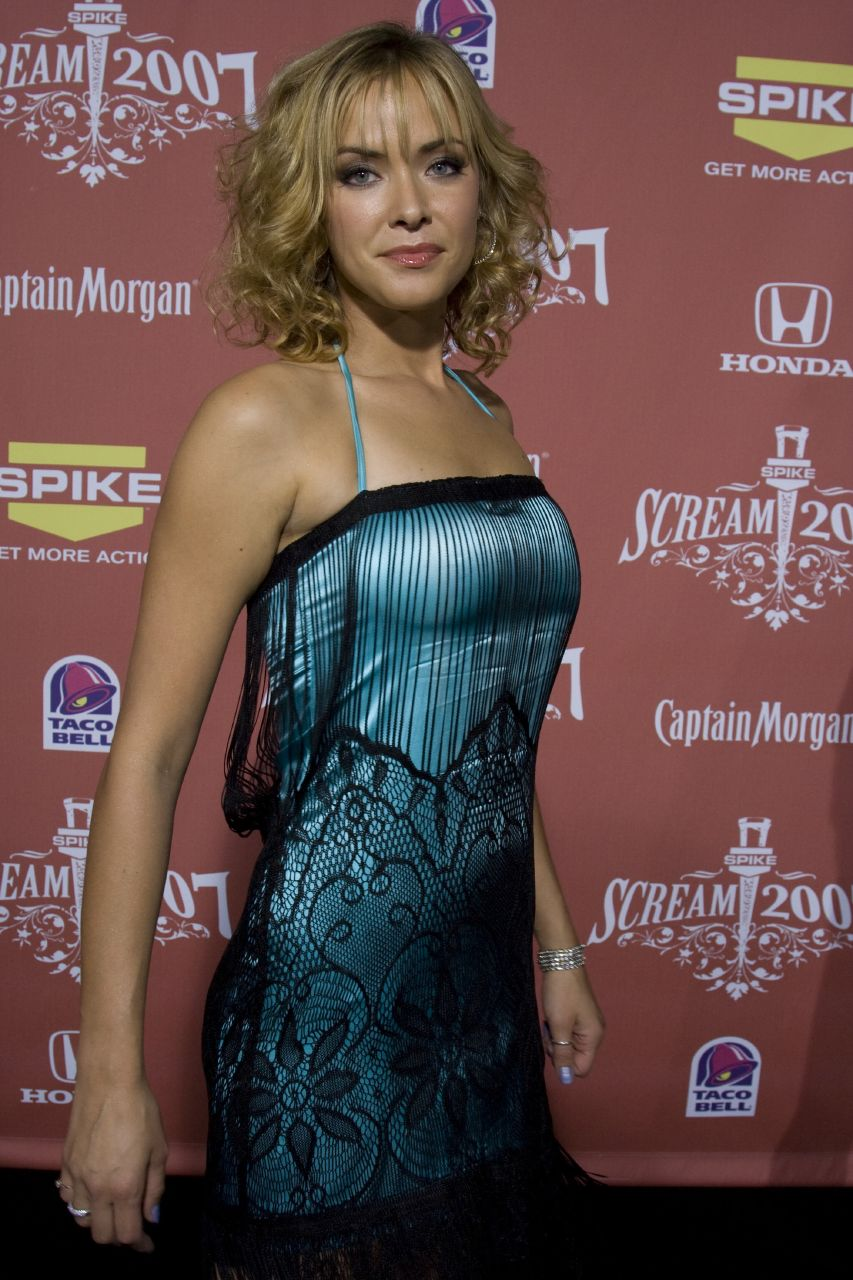
Loken at the 2007 Scream Awards

Loken's mother encouraged her to become a model. She participated at the 1994 Elite Model Look beauty contest. Loken started her acting career in 1994 as the third actress to play Danielle 'Dani' Andropoulos on an episode of As the World Turns. She later appeared in several television shows and films, including regular appearances on the television shows Philly, Unhappily Ever After and Boy Meets World.

In 1998, Loken starred in Mortal Kombat: Conquest as Taja. She played the gynoid T-X (Terminatrix) in the 2003 movie Terminator 3: Rise of the Machines. In 2004, she appeared in a German television movie, Die Nibelungen (also known as "Dark Kingdom: The Dragon King" or "Sword of Xanten"), which aired as a two-part miniseries and set a ratings record. She starred as the leading character in the 2006 film adaptation of the video game BloodRayne, and appeared in director Uwe Boll's film adaptation of the video game Dungeon Siege, called In the Name of the King.

She appeared in 10 episodes of the fourth season of The L Word, which debuted in January 2007. Additionally, she starred as the title character in the Sci-Fi Channel's series Painkiller Jane which aired from April to September 2007. In December 2011, Loken appeared in the fifth-season finale of the USA Network TV series Burn Notice as CIA agent Rebecca Lang, and would reprise that role in three sixth-season episodes during mid-2012.

In 2014, she starred in the action movie Mercenaries, alongside Cynthia Rothrock, Brigitte Nielsen, Vivica A. Fox, Zoë Bell and Nicole Bilderback.

In 2017, she co-starred in the romantic thriller film Body of Deceit, alongside Sarai Givaty.

== Personal life ==
Loken is bisexual. She stated in an interview with Chicago Tribune newspaper: "Kissing a girl is much, much nicer than kissing a man. I think it is more intimate, to be honest. I suppose it is more sensitive, I think females bond better than men, although I do find men attractive. Sometimes girls just want to go for it with a female friend. And usually, you'll get a good reaction from men who are looking at you. It wasn't the first time I kissed a girl when I kissed Pink, you know. Oh God, no. But I won't give too much away." She also stated in an interview with Curve magazine: "I have dated and have had sex with men and women and have to say that the relationships I have had with certain women have been much more fulfilling, sexually and emotionally, than of those with certain men. I connect with an aura, with energy. And if the person with whom I connect happens to be a female, that's just the way it is. That's what makes my wheels turn." And to AfterEllen: "I'm confident with who I am and being openly bisexual, and I think it's up to my generation to be open about that and to let people know that it's OK to be confident with who they are so that prejudice and judgment can become less through the years and for future generations."

On January 17, 2008, Loken announced on her website she was engaged to her Painkiller Jane co-star Noah Danby; the couple exchanged marriage vows at her family's farm on May 10, 2008. In an interview published on November 16, 2009, she announced she had separated from Danby and was dating a woman.

Loken gave birth to a son in May 2016. The father of the child is her boyfriend, JP Morgan Chase managing director Jonathan Bates.

== Filmography ==
=== Film ===
Year	Title	Role	Notes
1997	Academy Boyz	Linda Baker	
2001	Gangland	Angie	
2001	Air Panic	Josie	
2003	Terminator 3: Rise of the Machines	T-X	
2004	Worn Like a Tattoo	Mary's Mother	Short
2004	Dark Kingdom: The Dragon King	Queen Brunhild	TV movie
2005	BloodRayne	Rayne	
2006	Lime Salted Love	Zepher Genesee	
2007	In the Name of the King: A Dungeon Siege Tale	Elora	
2009	Darfur	Malin Lausberg	
2010	Ties That Bind	Hope Webster	TV movie
2011	S.W.A.T.: Firefight	Rose Walker	Video
2011	The Legend of Awesomest Maximus	Hottessa	Video
2011	Dangerously Close	Mrs. Linedrow	Short
2013	Bounty Killer	Catherine	
2013	Dark Power	Mila Driver	
2013	Fighting for Freedom	Karen	
2014	Black Rose	Emily Smith	
2014	Hunting the Phantom	Rush	
2014	Mercenaries	Kat Morgan	
2016	Beyond the Game	Amanda	
2017	Body of Deceit	Alice	
2019	The Madam of Purity Falls	Nicole Johnson	
2020	BSA Live	A Star	
2022	Repeater	Nadia Sykes	
2024	Darkness of Man	Claire	
2024	Dark Night of the Soul	Doctor Alex Valden	
2025	No Address	Kim	

=== Television ===
Year	Title	Role	Notes
1994	As the World Turns	Danielle Andropoulos (No. 3)	Regular Cast
1995	New York Undercover	Rena	Episode: "Young, Beautiful and Dead"
1996	Law & Order	Sonya Dubrow	Episode: "Savior"
1996	Aliens in the Family	Tiffany Kindall	Recurring Cast
1996–97	Unhappily Ever After	Sable O'Brien	Recurring Cast: Season 3
1996–98	Boy Meets World	Jennifer Bassett	Guest Cast: Season 4-5
1997	Lois & Clark: The New Adventures of Superman	Penny Barnes	Episode: "AKA Superman"
1997	Star Trek: Voyager	Malia	Episode: "Favorite Son"
1997	Just Shoot Me!	Kristanna	Episode: "In Your Dreams"
1997–98	Pensacola: Wings of Gold	Janine Kelly	Main Cast: Season 1
1998–99	Mortal Kombat: Conquest	Taja	Main Cast
1999	Sliders	Catherine Clark	Episode: "Revelations"
1999	Pacific Blue	Officer Claire Keene	Episode: "Blue Hawaii: Part 1 & 2"
2000	D.C.	Sarah Logan	Main Cast
2001–02	Philly	A.D.A. Lisa Walensky	Recurring Cast
2007	Painkiller Jane	Jane Vasco	Main Cast
2007–08	The L Word	Paige Sobel	Recurring Cast: Season 4, Guest: Season 5
2010	ACME Saturday Night	Herself/Guest Host	Episode: "Kristanna Loken"
2011–12	Burn Notice	Rebecca Lang	Guest: Season 5, Recurring Cast: Season 6
2012	Key and Peele	Red Falcon	Episode: "Gang Stand-Off"
2012	The Eric Andre Show	Herself	Episode: "Russell Brand"
2015	Girl Meets World	Jennifer Bassett Minkus	Episode: "Girl Meets I Am Farkle"
2017	Lethal Weapon	Adriana Stabilito	Episode: "Fork-Getta-Bout It"
2019	Dark Stories	Christine	Episode: La poupée sanglante, Long Night

=== Video games ===
Year	Title	Voice role	Notes
2003	Battlestar Galactica	Iphigenia / Lethe	
2003	Terminator 3: Rise of the Machines	T-X	
2004	Terminator 3: The Redemption	T-X	

== Awards and nominations ==
Year	Nominated work	Award	Category	Results
2004	Worn Like a Tattoo	Short Film Award	Best Supporting Actress	Won
2004	Terminator 3: Rise of the Machines	MTV Movie Awards Mexico	Sexiest She-Villain	Nominated
2004	Terminator 3: Rise of the Machines	Saturn Award	Best Supporting Actress	Nominated
2004	Terminator 3: Rise of the Machines	Saturn Award	Cinescape Genre Face of the Future	Nominated
2008	Lime Salted Love	New York International Independent Film & Video Festival	Best Supporting Actress	Won
