= Leonard Betts =

- The X-Files episode
- Leonard Betts, a cancer-eating mutant, creating a duplicate body. The effect required Toby Lindala to build a puppet with full-functioning mouth and eyes.
- Episode no.: Season 4 Episode 12
- Directed by: Kim Manners
- Written by: Vince Gilligan; John Shiban; Frank Spotnitz
- Production code: 4X14
- Original air date: January 26, 1997
- Running time: 44 minutes

Guest appearances
- Bill Dow as Charles Burks; Paul McCrane as Leonard Betts; Marjorie Lovett as Elaine Tanner; Jennifer Clement as Michelle Wilkes

Episode chronology
← Previous "El Mundo Gira"	Next → "Never Again"
- The X-Files season 4

"Leonard Betts" is the twelfth episode of the fourth season of the American science fiction television series The X-Files. It premiered on the Fox network on January 26, 1997. It was written by Vince Gilligan, John Shiban, and Frank Spotnitz, directed by Kim Manners, and featured a guest appearance by Paul McCrane as Leonard Betts/Albert Tanner. The episode is a "Monster-of-the-Week" story, unconnected to the series' wider mythology. Aired following Super Bowl XXXI, "Leonard Betts" became Fox's debut Super Bowl lead-out program since the network acquired NFL broadcast rights in 1994.

The show centers on FBI special agents Fox Mulder (David Duchovny) and Dana Scully (Gillian Anderson) who work on cases linked to the paranormal, called X-Files. Mulder is a believer in the paranormal, while the skeptical Scully has been assigned to debunk his work. In this episode, Mulder and Scully investigate the supposed death and regeneration of an emergency medical technician (EMT) named Leonard Betts, a mutant who subsists on cancer and can regenerate severed body parts.

"Leonard Betts" was a story milestone for the series, introducing the detection of Agent Scully's cancer, which would go on to play a larger role in the latter part of season four and much of season five. In addition, the episode has been analyzed for its themes of physical drives and psychological egoism. The production for the episode required several physically exerting stunts coupled with special effects in order to bring the illusions of the episode to life. The episode received positive reviews, with critics commenting positively on the character of Betts and McCrane's performance, and still ranks as the most watched episode of the series, receiving a Nielsen household rating of 17.2, being watched by 29.1 million people in its initial broadcast.

== Plot ==
In Pittsburgh, Leonard Betts (Paul McCrane), a paramedic, is decapitated when his ambulance collides with a truck. Later, at the morgue, his headless body leaves its cold chamber, knocks out the attendant, steals his clothes, and escapes. Fox Mulder (David Duchovny) and Dana Scully (Gillian Anderson) visit the morgue, where they find Betts's head in a medical waste dumpster. Scully attempts a cranial examination, but the head's eyes and mouth both suddenly open when she begins the procedure. Meanwhile, Mulder goes to Betts's apartment, where he finds the attendant's discarded clothes. When Mulder leaves, Betts—who has regrown his head—rises out of his iodine-filled bathtub.

Mulder interviews Michelle Wilkes (Jennifer Clement), Betts's former partner, who recollects his ability to detect cancer. When an interior slice of Betts's polymerized head is examined, the agents discover his frontal lobe displayed signs of pervasive cancer. Mulder has Chuck Burks (Bill Dow) subject the slice to a Kirlian photography test; the final image shows a corona discharge that takes the appearance of human shoulders.

Using fingerprint records, Scully learns that Betts shared fingerprints with a man called Albert Tanner. The agents visit his elderly mother, Elaine (Marjorie Lovett), who informs them Albert died in a car accident six years previously. Meanwhile, Wilkes tracks down Betts at another hospital and confronts him. After an apology, he gives her a lethal injection of potassium chloride; Betts is then pursued and captured by a security guard. After he is handcuffed to his car, Betts escapes by tearing off his thumb. The agents search the car the next morning, finding disposed tumors in a cooler in the trunk. Mulder believes Betts subsists on the tumors, and that his nature makes him the embodiment of a radical leap in evolution.

Upon learning the car is registered to Elaine, the agents have the police search her home. Elaine recounts how her son endured bullying as a child "because he was different", and says "he had his reasons" if he killed anybody. Meanwhile, Betts accosts a bar patron and kills him to obtain his cancerous lung. Later, in a storage unit, he seems to shed his body and create a duplicate. When the agents come across the storage unit, the duplicate Betts attempts to flee in a car, which explodes when fired upon and seemingly kills him. Scully suggests Betts's first death as Albert Tanner was staged, but when they exhume Tanner's casket, they find his body still inside. Mulder becomes convinced Betts can not only regenerate his body parts, but his entire body itself. Because of this, he believes Betts is still at large.

At Elaine's behest, Betts removes a cancerous tumor from her body before summoning an ambulance. The agents, already staking out Elaine's house, encounter the paramedics when they arrive. Scully accompanies Elaine to the hospital while Mulder conducts a search of the neighborhood. However, after arriving at the hospital, Scully realizes Betts has stowed himself away on the roof of the ambulance. Betts locks her inside the ambulance with him, calmly but apologetically telling her, like his earlier victim, she has "something I need". After a struggle, Scully kills Betts by pressing charged defibrillator paddles against his head. Scully remains silently stunned by Betts's suggestion she has cancer. Later, in her apartment, she wakes up with a cough and nosebleed, confirming her illness.

== Production ==
=== Writing ===
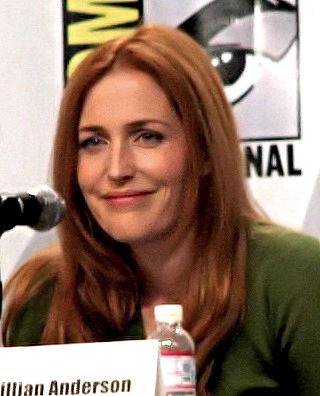
Gillian Anderson's character Dana Scully is revealed to be suffering from cancer in this episode.

"Leonard Betts" was written by Vince Gilligan, John Shiban, and Frank Spotnitz and directed by Kim Manners. Scripts written by Gilligan, Shiban, and Spotnitz were humorously credited by the production crew to one "John Gillnitz"—a portmanteau of the three writers' names. According to Spotnitz, the script for "Leonard Betts" was "not particularly well-loved at the time", but it became "one of [his] favorite monster shows". Originally, the episode "Never Again" was supposed to air before this episode, but, as Vince Gilligan explained, "[Series creator Chris Carter] really wanted to grab viewers who had never seen us before [the Super Bowl], and we knew the best way to do that would be with a really creepy stand-alone monster story." Thus, the air date of "Leonard Betts" was flipped with "Never Again" in order to ensure that the former episode, which featured the show's two stars in their traditional roles, aired after the Super Bowl.

The episode is the first to confirm Agent Scully's cancer. The idea of giving the character cancer had been floated by Spotnitz during the show's third season, but for whatever reason, the concept remained on the back-burner until storylines for the fourth season were being developed. Reportedly, when Chris Carter informed Gillian Anderson that her character would be diagnosed with cancer, she was "delighted" as it presented her with an artistic challenge and enabled her to portray her character in a new manner. However, Anderson was only informed of this plotpoint after she filmed "Never Again", which was produced before "Leonard Betts" but aired after. Consequently, Anderson has said that had she known the twist ending of this episode while filming "Never Again", she "would have played the part [in 'Never Again'] differently". Regardless, John Shiban considers "Leonard Betts" to be "a great X-Files story" and very important because it established the story-arc featuring Scully's cancer.

=== Casting and filming ===
Actor Paul McCrane, who later went on to play Dr. Robert Romano on ER, was cast to play Leonard Betts. Betts's character was supposed to be a "sympathetic" creature who "killed not out of vengeance or anger but for survival", and director Kim Manners thus urged McCrane to perform with "emotional conviction." Manners later explained that "I found that if you take the absurd and base it in the reality of human emotion, the audience is going to buy it as if it actually exists. You know?" Actor Bill Dow also appears in the episode, reprising his character Chuck Burks.

The show's design staff made extensive use of makeup to give McCrane the right look; applying all the makeup reportedly took "several hours". McCrane's eyes were also augmented with specially made contact lenses. Many of McCrane's scenes were physically exerting, such as the autopsy scene, which required McCrane to stick his head through a discreet hole in the set's mock dissection table. McCrane then held still, thereby giving the illusion that his head was severed and resting on the table. The scene in the bathtub required McCrane to spend several "long minutes" underwater motionless in full makeup. The shot in which a new Betts emerges from the old one's mouth was created by Toby Lindala. Lindala intercut shots of McCrane with shots of a specially designed puppet that had a full-functioning mouth and eyes. Laverne Basham and Lindala were later both nominated for an Emmy for Outstanding Makeup in a Series for their roles in this episode.

== Academic analysis ==
=== Themes ===
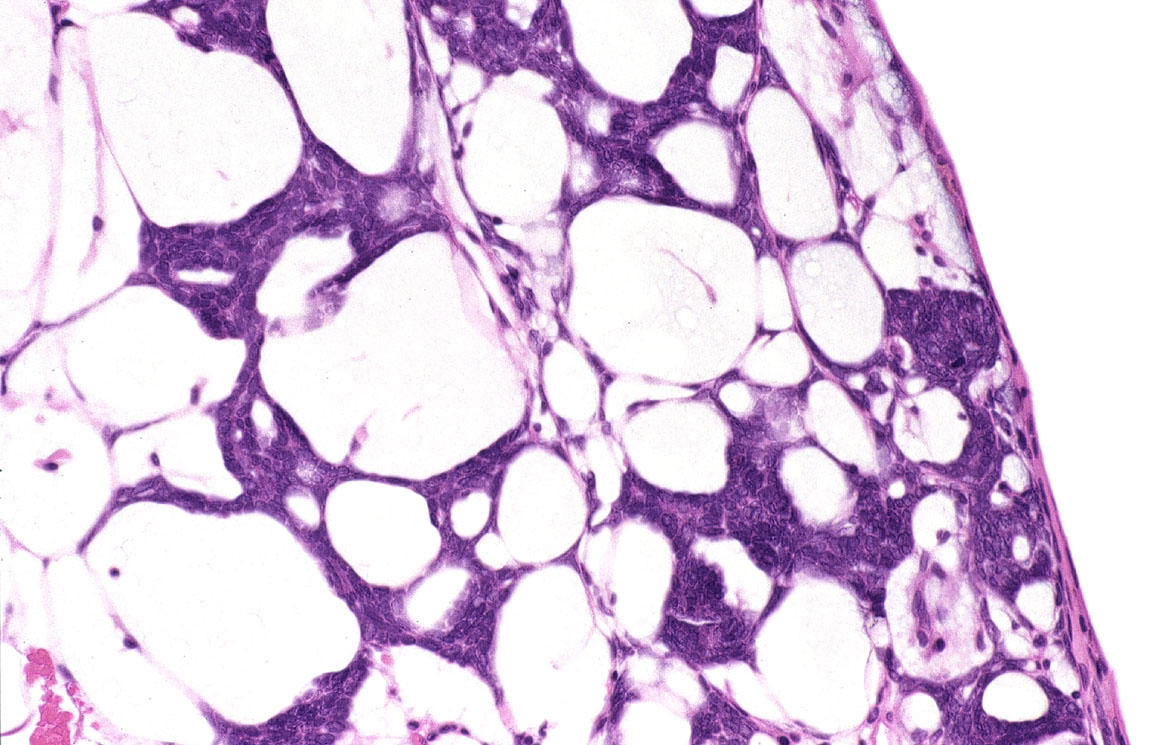
According to Anne Simon, Betts's body is composed of blastema.

According to Jan Delasara, one of the major themes of "Leonard Betts" is the exploration of "irresistible physical drives." Delasara argues that in Betts's case, his desire to kill is due to a biological need, not a malevolent desire to murder. The A.V. Club's Emily VanDerWerff agrees, writing in her review of the episode, "It also helps that Leonard's such an understandably human monster. On some level, he just wants to survive, and he's not happy about what he has to do to be able to survive." Conversely, Amy Donaldson, in her book We Want to Believe argues that Betts's condition, in which he is "riddled with cancer" but can "see the sickness within people", is a metaphor for someone who "has let sin or evil become the regular course of life". Although Betts can detect and consume the illness, his motives are derived from "his own self appetite". Donaldson contrasts him with the soul eater, from eight season entry "The Gift". In the episode, Agent John Doggett, played by Robert Patrick, stumbles upon a creature that altruistically absorbs the diseases and ailments of others. Donaldson argues that the soul eater is the polar opposite of Betts because it takes an illness in order to help a person, even though it hurts itself in the process. In other words, the soul eater is altruistic, whereas Betts is selfish.

"Leonard Betts" serves as the first story in a multi-season story-arc that features Agent Scully being diagnosed with terminal cancer. Richard Edwards and Dean Kowalski, in the chapter "Some Philosophical Reflections on 'Trust No One'" of the book The Philosophy of The X-Files, argue that Scully withholding the knowledge of her cancer from Mulder is an example of psychological egoism in a protagonist. They reason that by not telling her partner, she is withholding the information in an act of self-interest.

Elyce Rae Helford in her book Fantasy Girls: Gender in the New Universe of Science Fiction and Fantasy Television notes that the episode contains themes of "maternal sacrifice and maternal monstrosity" that are common throughout the series. Leonard Betts's mother nearly sacrifices her own life to give her son the cancer he needs in order to escape death. Helford argues that these motifs concerning maternal figures are most notable in the season four and five "Monster-of-the-Week" episodes, such as "Home".

=== Scientific research ===
According to biology professor and science advisor to the X-Files Anne Simon, the manner in which Betts can regrow limbs is somewhat similar to the way in which amphibians and newts can regenerate tails and other limbs. She notes that many amphibian cells can "turn back the clock [and] revert back to an [embryonic] time when any fate was possible". In humans, several types of cells – skin, endometrial, blood cells and liver cells – are able to regenerate, however, the process is different via the stem cell. Simon also postulates that Betts was able to regenerate because he had a specific relationship between his immune system and his cellular growth. She notes that what Scully and Burks mistook for tumors were actually blastema, or masses of cells capable of growth and regeneration into organs or body parts. Simon also suggests that, for Betts to truly be composed entirely of cancer cells, he would have to lack functioning p53, the tumor suppressor protein. This condition, however, is always fatal.

== Broadcast and reception ==
=== Ratings ===
"Leonard Betts" premiered on the Fox network on January 26, 1997 immediately following Super Bowl XXXI. The episode earned a Nielsen rating of 17.2 with a 29 share, meaning that it was seen by 17.2% of all 18- to 49-year-olds, and 29% of all 18- to 49-year-olds watching television at the time of the broadcast; this made the episode the highest-rated episode in the series' run. The episode was viewed by over 29.1 million people, making it the most-watched episode of the series. David Lavery, in his book The Essential Cult Reader, argues that the Super Bowl switch that the series made with "Leonard Betts" in order to make the episode more appealing to non-viewers was instrumental in the trend that favored programs being aired sequentially later on during syndication.

=== Reviews ===
The episode received largely positive reviews from critics. The A.V. Club gave the episode an A, with critic Emily VanDerWerff noting that "'Leonard Betts' deserves to be remembered [...] There's very little in this episode that doesn't work. 'Leonard Betts' isn't the best episode of The X-Files, but it signifies that we're moving into one of the show's very best periods, and it does so with a confidence and verve that the series didn't always display." Many critics praised the tenacity of the writers for airing an episode featuring such a creepy character after the Super Bowl. Writing for Den of Geek, John Moore listed Betts as one of his "Top 10 X-Files Baddies", writing that "Fox had the Superbowl[sic], the Superbowl happens on a Sunday, Fox decides to run the show in the prime slot after the big game... [...] So, did, they soft-pedal things in order to grab a wider audience? Er... no. Instead they decided to feature a cancer-eating living tumour that could re-grow his own limbs at will. That's why I love the X-Files."

Paula Vitaris from Cinefantastique gave the episode a positive review and awarded it three stars out of four. Vitaris praised the episode's balance of humor and horror, noting "Although 'Leonard Betts' is not a comedy, the three writers take such pleasure in the story that you buy the situation. There's a lot of situational (and scary) humor in the script." Furthermore, she noted that the ending revelation that Scully has cancer and the following conversation between Mulder and Scully was "one of the season's best scenes." Robert Shearman, in his book Wanting to Believe: A Critical Guide to The X-Files, Millennium & The Lone Gunmen, rated the episode four stars out of five. The author wrote positively of the "amiable quality to the story which makes its finale moments all the more of a kick in the teeth." Shearman also wrote that "Leonard Betts" was the first episode "to come along [in the fourth season] which feels light and frothy, and it deliberately makes the unkindest cut of all."

The character of Leonard Betts itself has also attracted positive criticism. Connie Ogle from PopMatters ranked the character among the "greatest" monsters-of-the-week, describing him as someone who could "grow back his own head after being decapitated, a feat that resulted in the show’s best-rated episode." VanDerWerff praised the humanistic way Betts was presented.

== Bibliography ==
- Delasara, Jan (2000), PopLit, PopCult, and The X-Files: Critical Exploration, McFarland & Company, ISBN 9780786407897
- Donaldson, Amy (2011). We Want to Believe. Cascade Books. ISBN 9781606083611.
- Helford, Elyce Rae (2000). Fantasy Girls: Gender in the New Universe of Science Fiction and Fantasy Television. Rowman & Littlefield. ISBN 9780847698356.
- Hurwitz, Matt; Chris Knowles (2008). The Complete X-Files. Insight Editions. ISBN 9781933784724.
- Koven, Mikel J. (2010), "The X-Files", in Lavery, David (ed.), The Essential Cult TV Reader, Lexington: University Press of Kentucky, ISBN 9780813125688
- Richard Edwards; Kowalski, Dean (2009), "Some Philosophical Reflections on 'Trust No One'", in Dean Kowalski (ed.), The Philosophy of The X-Files, University Press of Kentucky, ISBN 9780813192277
- Meisler, Andy (1998), I Want to Believe, Perennial Currents, ISBN 9780061053863
- Shearman, Robert (2009). Wanting to Believe: A Critical Guide to The X-Files, Millennium & The Lone Gunmen. Mad Norwegian Press. ISBN 9780975944691.
- Simon, Anne (1999). The Real Science Behind the X-Files: Microbes, Meteorites, and Mutants. Simon & Schuster. ISBN 9780743284950.
