= Rodney Rowland =

American actor (born 1964)

- Born: Rodney G. Rowland; February 20, 1964 (age 62); Newport Beach, California, U.S.
- Other name: Rod Rowland
- Occupation: Actor
- Years active: 1984–present

Rodney G. Rowland (born February 20, 1964) is an American actor. He is credited as Rod Rowland in more recent productions. Rowland's most noted appearances to date were as 1st Lieutenant Cooper Hawkes in 1995's Space: Above and Beyond and P. Wiley in The 6th Day, starring Arnold Schwarzenegger.

== Early life ==
Born in Newport Beach, California, Rowland is the youngest of four children and the son of a minister. After a brief time as a student on a watersport scholarship at Pepperdine University, Rowland went to Europe and worked as a model for Haute Couture labels like Gucci, Versace, and J.Crew. On the suggestion of Bruce Weber, he began taking acting classes and took on roles in film and theater.

== Career ==
Rowland's first big break was in James Wong and Glen Morgan's science fiction war drama, Space: Above and Beyond in 1995. Despite auditions that were disastrous, Morgan and Wong brought Rowland on board to play the genetically engineered In Vitro Cooper Hawkes. During the shoot for the episode "Who Monitors the Birds?", he became ill due to over work, succumbing to two bouts of exhaustion and bronchitis.

Rowland would later work with Wong and Morgan again on The X-Files in the season four episode "Never Again", appearing alongside Gillian Anderson. His character, Ed Jerse, emotionally connects with Anderson's Dana Scully and encourages her to have a small Ouroboros snake tattooed on the small of her back. Rowland would later date Anderson until 1998.

He appeared in a recurring role on Veronica Mars portraying Liam Fitzpatrick, a lead character of the Irish gang and family of crime, the Fighting Fitzpatricks.

== Filmography ==
=== Film ===
- 1995 Just Looking as Lech
- 1995 If Someone Had Known as Doug Petit
- 1996 Marshal Law as Butchie
- 1996 Hearts Adrift as Rowdy Heller
- 2000 The 6th Day as P. Wiley
- 2000 Dancing at the Blue Iguana as Charlie
- 2001 Soulkeeper (aka. Our Souls To Keep or The Chosen Ones) as Corey Mahoney
- 2001 Air Panic as Neil McCabe
- 2002 Hard Cash (aka. Run for the Money) as Butch (credited as Rod Rowland)
- 2003 Shade as Jeff (credited as Rod Rowland)
- 2005 Mr. Fix It as Tip (credited as Rod Rowland)
- 2007 I Know Who Killed Me as Kenny Scalfe
- 2013 Savaged

=== Television ===
- 1994 Baywatch, episode: "Fire by Fire", as Beach hobo
- 1996 Space: Above and Beyond, starring as 1st Lt. Cooper Hawkes
- 1997 X-Files, episode: "Never Again", as Ed Jerse
- 1998 To Have & to Hold, episode: "These Boots Were Made For Walking", as Paolo
- 1998 Welcome to Paradox, episode: "The Extra", as Daniel Gray/C-7
- 1998 Pensacola: Wings of Gold, starring as Lt. Bobby "Chaser" Griffin (credited as Rod Rowland)
- 2000 Dark Angel episode: "411 on the DL", as Mitch - Valerie's Husband
- 2001 C.S.I., episode: "You've Got Male", as Gavin Pollard
- 2001 Seven Days, episode: "Crystal Blue Perfection", as Cdr. W. Streck
- 2002 Fastlane, episode: "Gone Native", as Dallas (credited as Rod Rowland)
- 2002 V.I.P., episode: "A True Val Story", as Ryan Hill
- 2002 Strong Medicine, episode: "Shock", as abusive husband
- 2003 Angel, episode: "Conviction", as Corbin Fries (credited as Rod Rowland)
- 2004 Charmed, episode: "Hyde School Reunion", as Rick Gittridge (credited as Rod Rowland)
- 2006 Veronica Mars, recurring as Liam Fitzpatrick (credited as Rod Rowland)
- 2006 Bones, episode: "The Man with the Bone", as Dane McGinnis
- 2006 The O.C., episode: "The Road Warrior", as Jack Harper
- 2006 Without a Trace, episode: "Patient X", as Vince Weaver (credited as Rod Rowland)
- 2007 Cold Case, episode: "Thick as Thieves", as Spencer Mason '07 (credited as Rod Rowland)
- 2007 Weeds recurring as Ches (credited as Rod Rowland)
- 2009 Burn Notice, episode: "Bad Breaks", as Bank Robber
- 2012 The Mentalist episode: "Pink Champagne on Ice", as Bartender
- 2012 Criminal Minds episode: "Closing Time", as Doug Summers
- 2013 Castle, episode: "Time Will Tell", as Mick Linden (credited as Rod Rowland)
- 2013 American Horror Story: Asylum, episode: "Madness Ends", as Milo (credited as Rod Rowland)
- 2015 Grey's Anatomy, episode: "I felt the Earth move", as Brian
- 2016 Secrets and Lies, episode: "The Daughter", as Jake (credited as Rod Rowland)
- 2017 Twin Peaks, episode: "Part 15", as Chuck
- 2021 The Walking Dead, episode: "Here's Negan", as Craven
- 2021 BMF (season 1) as Doctor
