= Soulkeeper =

2001 American TV-movie

- Written by: Darin Ferriola
- Directed by: Darin Ferriola
- Starring: Rodney Rowland; Kevin Patrick Walls; Robert Davi; Tommy "Tiny'" Lister; Brad Dourif
- Music by: Kevin Saunders Hayes
- Country of origin: United States
- Original language: English

Production
- Producers: Don Dunn; Darin Ferriola; Jeff Ritchie
- Running time: 105 minutes

Original release
- Network: Sci Fi Channel
- Release: October 13, 2001

Soulkeeper is a Sci Fi Pictures original TV-movie that premiered October 13, 2001 on the Sci Fi Channel.

== Synopsis ==
After stealing Abraham Lincoln's stovepipe hat from a Civil War reenactment and then being subsequently dumped by their unseen boss "Mr M", thieves Corey Mahoney (Rodney Rowland) and Terrence Christian (Kevin Patrick Walls) are at a loss until they are hired by the mysterious Pascal (Brad Dourif). His proposition is for them to acquire the Rock of Lazarus, an ancient relic capable of returning souls back to Earth. In return for this, he guarantees $8,000 up front and $100,000 when the job is done. However, troubles soon arise as they encounter demons and Simon Magus, an evil sorcerer believing he is the son of God.

== Cast ==
- Rodney Rowland as Corey Mahoney
- Kevin Patrick Walls as Terrence Christian
- Robert Davi as Mallion
- Tommy "Tiny" Lister as Chad
- Brad Dourif as Pascal
- Karen Black as Martha "Magnificent Martha"
- William Bassett as Old Bum
- Michael Ironside as voice of Mr. M (uncredited)

== Production ==
Blur Studio produced more than 100 digital visual-effects scenes and several 3D computer-animated characters for the telefilm.
