= Never Again (The X-Files) =

- The X-Files episode
- Ed Jerse's tattoo, Betty, possessing its own mind. Inspired by the tattoos of "Brooklyn Joe" Lieber, Betty was voiced by Jodie Foster.
- Episode no.: Season 4 Episode 13
- Directed by: Rob Bowman
- Written by: Glen Morgan; James Wong
- Production code: 4X13
- Original air date: February 2, 1997
- Running time: 44 minutes

Guest appearances
- Rodney Rowland as Ed Jerse; Jodie Foster as Voice of Betty; Bill Croft as Comrade Svo; Jay Donahue as Detective Gouveia; B.J. Harrison as a Jehovah's Witness; Igor Morozov as Vsevlod Pudovkin; Jillian Fargey as Kaye Schilling; Jan Bailey Mattia as Ms. Hadden; Ian Robison as Detective Smith; Barry "Bear" Hortin as Bartender; Marilyn Chin as Mrs. Shima-Tsuno; Rita Bozi as Ms. Vansen; Natasha Vasiluk as Russian Store Owner; Peter Nadler as Ed's Lawyer; Jenn Forgie as Ed's Ex-Wife; Sean Pritchard as Ed's Ex-Wife's Lawyer; Carla Stewart as Judge; Doug Devlin as Young Man

Episode chronology
← Previous "Leonard Betts"	Next → "Memento Mori"
- The X-Files season 4

"Never Again" is the thirteenth episode of the fourth season of the American science fiction television series The X-Files. It was written by producers Glen Morgan and James Wong, and directed by Rob Bowman. The episode aired in the United States on February 2, 1997, on the Fox network and in the United Kingdom on BBC One on December 3, 1997. The episode is a "Monster-of-the-Week" story, a stand-alone plot which is unconnected to the series' wider mythology. The episode received a Nielsen rating of 13 and was viewed by 21.36 million viewers. It received mostly positive reviews from television critics.

The show centers on FBI special agents Fox Mulder (David Duchovny) and Dana Scully (Gillian Anderson) who work on cases linked to the paranormal, called X-Files. Mulder is a believer in the paranormal, while the skeptical Scully has been assigned to debunk his work. In this episode, Scully leaves town—and Mulder—for a solo assignment. She soon meets Ed Jerse, a man who is being mentally controlled by a drug-related side effect of his tattoo. His tattoo, affectionately named Betty, does not want to share him, especially not with Scully.

Although "Never Again" was directed by Bowman, it was originally scheduled to be directed by film director Quentin Tarantino. Tarantino was unable to direct the entry due to a dispute with the Directors Guild of America. Gillian Anderson was particularly pleased with the episode showing a different side of Scully; she had specifically asked Morgan and Wong to write an episode that explored Scully's dark side. Several cast members from Morgan and Wong's series Space: Above and Beyond were cast in the episode.

== Plot ==
In Philadelphia, Ed Jerse loses a divorce settlement to his ex-wife, who has sole custody of his children. After getting drunk at a bar, Ed wanders into a tattoo parlor and impulsively receives a tattoo depicting a Sailor Jerry-like pin-up girl with the words "Never Again" under her image. At work the next day, Ed hears a woman calling him a "loser"; he has a violent confrontation with a female co-worker—who denies saying anything—and is subsequently subdued.

In Washington, Agents Fox Mulder and Dana Scully conduct a discreet meeting with a Russian informant, Vsevlod Pudovkin, who claims to have seen a UFO at a secret research center. Upon returning to FBI headquarters, Mulder heads out on vacation to visit Graceland, leaving Scully to follow up on the Pudovkin case for him. Scully is uninterested in the case and expresses serious doubts about Pudovkin's credibility, leading to an argument with Mulder. Scully becomes upset over the direction her life and career are going.

Meanwhile, Ed is fired via telephone. He hears the same voice as before and yells at the woman living below him, thinking it was her. Upon hearing the voice after a pair of Jehovah's Witnesses stop by, Ed goes downstairs and murders his neighbor, throwing her body in the furnace. When the voice talks to him again, Jerse realizes it is coming from his new tattoo. Scully heads to Philadelphia and watches Pudovkin enter a tattoo parlor. Inside, she sees Ed arguing with the owner, wanting the tattoo removed. Ed strikes up a conversation with Scully and invites her out to dinner, which she initially declines.

That night, Scully talks to Mulder over the phone and informs him that Pudovkin is a con man and part of the Russian mafia. Frustrated by the conversation, Scully calls Jerse and tells him that she changed her mind. At a nearby lounge, Scully is concerned about Ed's arm, where he has burned the tattoo with a cigarette butt. Ed convinces Scully to get a tattoo, and she has one of an Ouroboros applied to her back. Scully stays at Ed's apartment. The tattoo is angry at him, saying she will be dead if he kisses her, which he does anyway.

The next morning, two detectives arrive at the apartment after Ed goes out, telling Scully that Ed's neighbor is missing and blood was found in her apartment with an unusual chemical substance in it. Scully researches the material on Ed's laptop and tries to call Mulder, but hangs up before Mulder has a chance to answer. When Ed arrives, Scully tells him that they found blood in his neighbor's apartment and that it was likely his. She thinks that the chemical came from the tattoo ink and wants them both to head to the hospital to be tested. Ed tells Scully about the voice he has been hearing from his tattoo.

As Scully heads to the other room to get ready, her FBI badge falls out of her coat pocket. Scully discreetly picks it back up without Ed noticing. The tattoo begins to talk again, convincing Ed to redial Scully's last call to see who she was speaking to. An FBI operator answers and, upon learning that Scully is an FBI agent, the tattoo forces Ed to attack her. Scully tries to escape but is overpowered by Ed, who wraps her in a bedsheet and carries her down to the basement to throw her in the furnace. At the last moment, Ed is able to overpower the impulses of the tattoo and instead thrusts his own arm into the furnace.

Scully returns to Washington and is congratulated by Mulder for being the first person to make a second X-File appearance. Ed was brought to a burn center in Philadelphia where the doctors found ergot derivatives in his blood, probably from contaminated dyes in the ink used by the tattoo parlor. The same chemicals were found in Scully's blood, but not enough to cause hallucinations. Mulder wonders if this all happened because of their earlier argument, to which Scully replies that not everything is about him.

== Production ==
=== Writing and directing ===
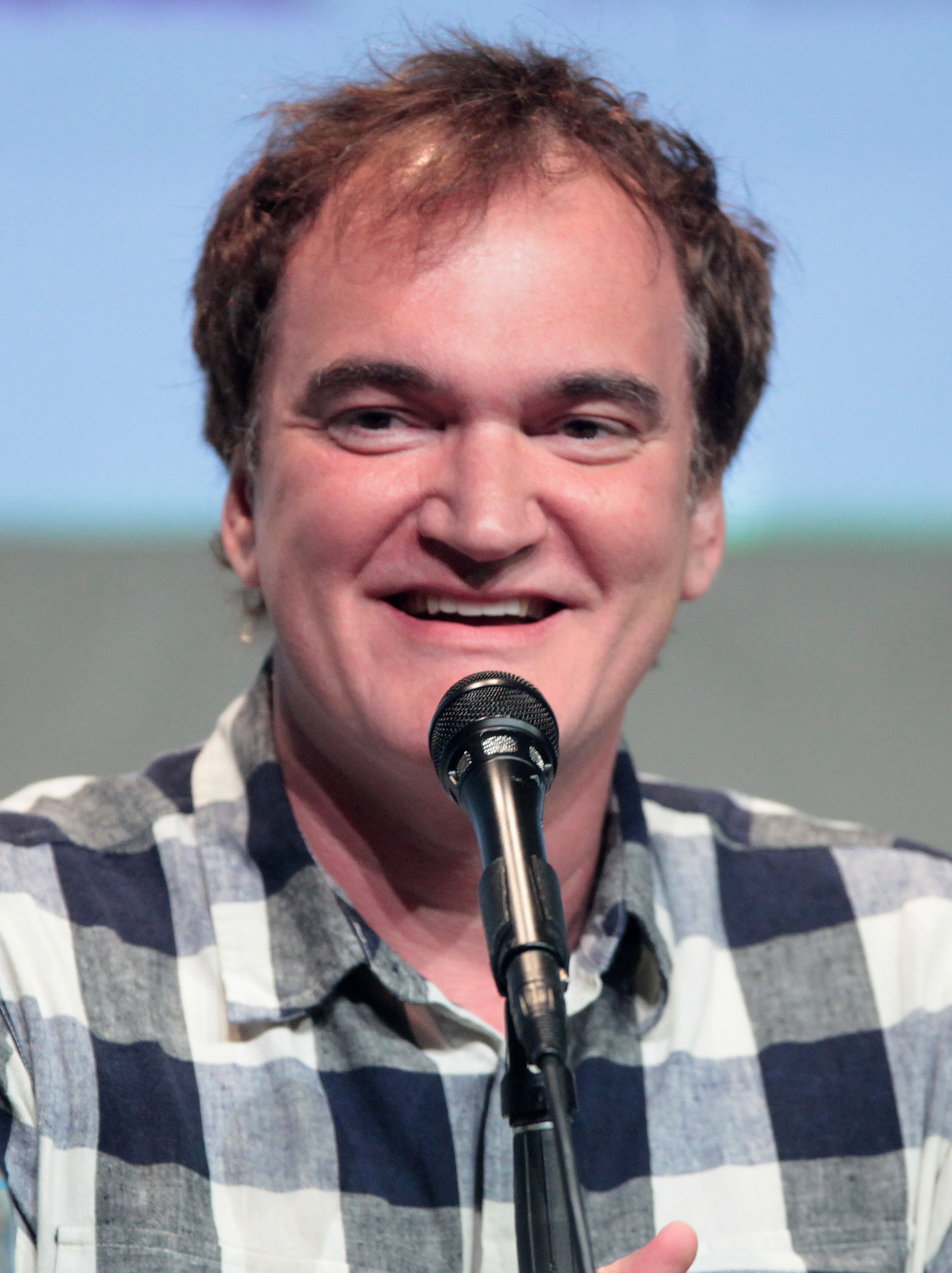
Quentin Tarantino was originally slated to direct the episode.

"Never Again" was written by writing partners Glen Morgan and James Wong, making it their final episode of The X-Files until they returned to the show during its tenth season; following this episode, the two took over as executive producers of the Fox program Millennium (developed, like The X-Files, by Chris Carter). The initial story the two developed was a "sort of Abraham Lincoln's ghost in the White House type of thing", which would have involved Mulder and Scully investigating the haunting. Morgan explained that he had "done a lot of research and [he] had always wanted to write a feature about Lincoln's ghost". However, due to the massive amounts of rewrites the two were forced to do for "Musings of a Cigarette Smoking Man", both Morgan and Wong lost interest in their original story. Morgan explained, "I felt they didn't want my heart and soul anymore, so I wouldn't give [the ghost story] to them". The two later crafted "Never Again" in its place. Years later, Frank Spotnitz said that he "always wondered about" their original story and what the finished product would have been like.

Gillian Anderson was particularly pleased with the episode, as it shows a different side of Scully. She said:

I thought [the plot of "Never Again"] was a great idea. I personally was going through a dark period at the time, and I wanted to explore Scully's dark side. For some reason, Glen and Jim were on the same wavelength that week. Afterward, a lot of people told me that on that episode I was so 'unlike' Scully or that 'it showed my range'. I told them I thought they were wrong. I don't think that what I did here was out of character for Scully. The only thing different is that the audience hadn't seen it before.

Initially, Anderson called up Morgan and asked him to write a story in which Scully "fall[s] hard" for another man, leading to an "intense kind of romantic or passionate relationship". Morgan obliged and wrote a scene featuring Scully enjoying a passionate night with Jerse. This was later removed from the script by series creator Chris Carter—making it the only time that Carter had removed one of Morgan's scenes. Morgan later noted, "I think Chris thought that I was monkeying around with him, but I really wasn't."

While "Never Again" was directed by Rob Bowman, the job was originally supposed to go to Quentin Tarantino, but he was prevented by the Directors Guild of America; the guild noted that Tarantino, who is not a member, failed to join the union after working on ER, violating an agreement the two parties had made. A spokeswoman from 20th Century Fox later noted, "Quentin approached us, we were very excited at the opportunity. We made some special arrangements, and we're disappointed that it's not happening. But we bow to Quentin's philosophical stance [and] we hope something can be worked out for the future."

The episode's air date was flipped with the episode "Leonard Betts" in order to ensure that the latter episode, which featured the show's two stars in their traditional roles, aired after the Super Bowl. Anderson has said that she "would have played the part [in 'Never Again'] differently" had she been aware of this at the time, as Scully discovers that she has cancer at the end of "Leonard Betts".

=== Casting and effects ===
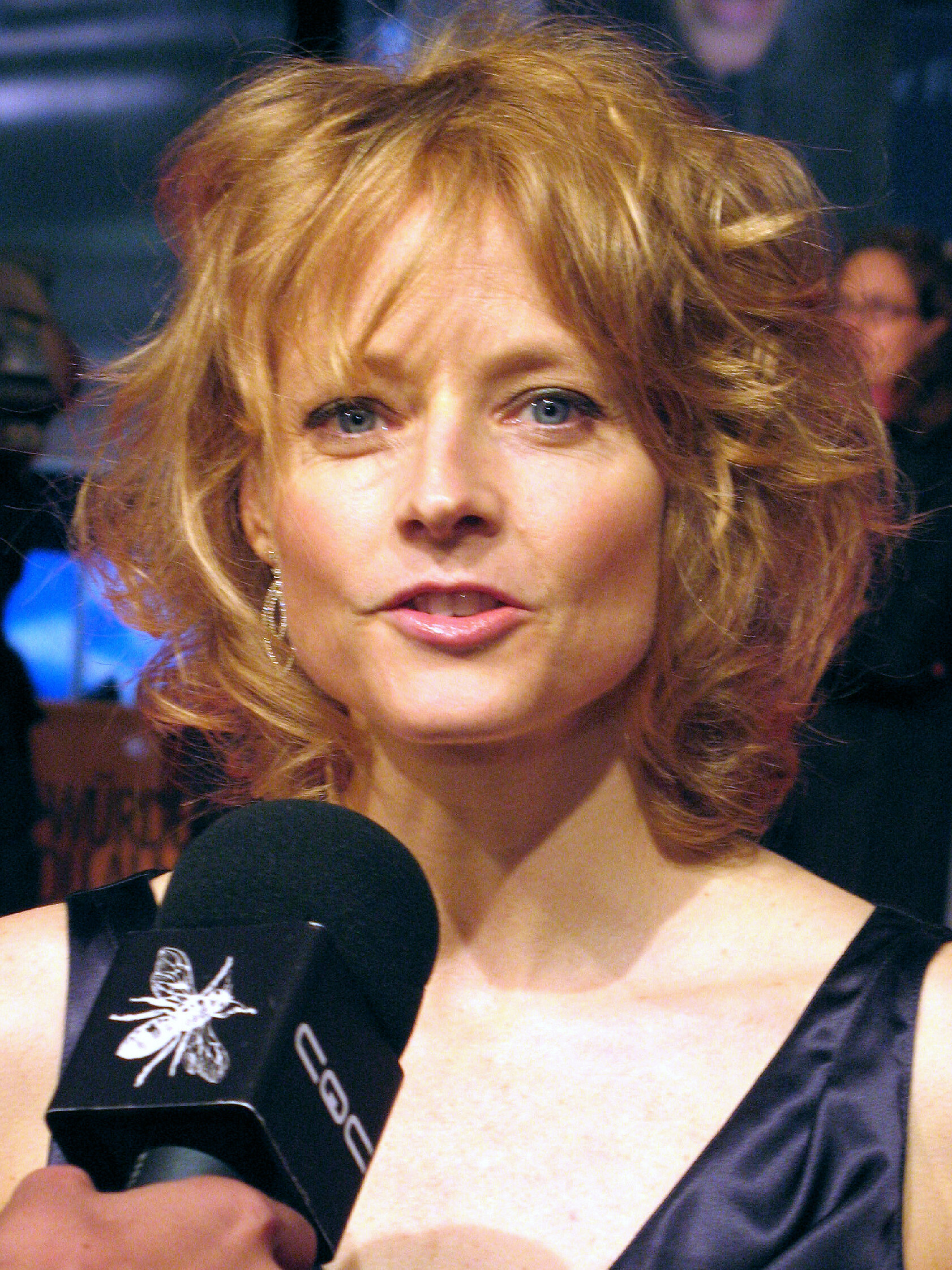
The evil tattoo Betty was voiced by Jodie Foster.

The actor who portrays Ed Jerse, Rodney Rowland, was a former cast member of Glen Morgan and James Wong's short-lived Fox series Space: Above and Beyond. He and Anderson dated for a period of time after this episode. Jodie Foster—a friend of series' casting agent Randy Stone—provided the voice for Ed's tattoo, Betty. Anderson initially volunteered to get a real Ouroboros tattoo for the episode, but she was later told by the production crew that it would "have taken too long [and] it wouldn't have been practical." Kristina Lyne from the show's art department thus designed several stick-on decals that emulated the look of real tattoos. These faux tattoos were printed off by a production company called Real Creations and later augmented with makeup courtesy of series makeup artist Laverne Basham. The Betty tattoo itself was inspired by the unique designs of the San Francisco tattoo artist "Brooklyn Joe" Lieber.

== Reception ==
"Never Again" was originally broadcast in the United States on the Fox network on February 2, 1997. This episode earned a Nielsen rating of 13, with a 19 share, meaning that roughly 13 percent of all television-equipped households, and 19 percent of households watching television, were tuned in to the episode. It was viewed by 21.36 million viewers.

The episode received mostly positive reviews from television critics. Zack Handlen from The A.V. Club was positive towards the episode and gave it an A. He applauded the fact that it "lets Scully be flawed" and allowed her to be "far more human" than usual on the show. Handlen concluded that the episode was a success because it illustrated "the way our need to connect with others makes us vulnerable". He was, however, critical of Mulder's actions in the episode, calling him a "spoiled ass" and noted that there was a "little boy ignored feel to his dialogue at the end". Meghan Deans from Tor.com wrote positively of the episode and noted that "[i]t is fortunate, I think, that the Super Bowl forced the change in sequence." She argued that, had "Leonard Betts" not aired before "Never Again", the audience would have been forced to "read her actions as reactions to Mulder and Mulder alone" rather than against the fact that she has cancer.

Paula Vitaris from Cinefantastique gave the episode a positive review and awarded it three stars out of four. She called Scully's unhappiness with her situation "understandable" and positively critiqued Gillian Anderson, calling her performance "wonderful". Vitaris, however, was critical of the "Leonard Betts"/"Never Again" switch, writing that "nothing in this episode points to fear of cancer as Scully's motivation". She concluded, however, that "['Never Again'] is a fascinating look at a whole new side of [Scully]." Not all reviews were glowing. Robert Shearman, in his book Wanting to Believe: A Critical Guide to The X-Files, Millennium & The Lone Gunmen, on the other hand, gave the episode a mixed review and rated it two-and-a-half stars out of five. The author was critical of Scully's behavior, noting that "seeing Scully as angry and bored and believing her life is pointless isn't really Scully". Shearman argued that Scully's belief that her life is boring is easily countered by the fact that "she hunts fluke monsters, catches serial killers, and gets abducted by aliens". Despite this, Shearman wrote that "Gillian Anderson makes it work."

== See also ==
- List of unmade episodes of The X-Files

== Bibliography ==
- Hurwitz, Matt; Knowles, Chris (2008). The Complete X-Files: Behind the Series the Myths and the Movies. San Rafael, CA: Insight Editions. ISBN 9781933784724.
- Meisler, Andy (1998). I Want to Believe: The Official Guide to the X-Files Volume 3. Harper Prism. ISBN 0061053864.
- Shearman, Robert (2009). Wanting to Believe: A Critical Guide to The X-Files, Millennium & The Lone Gunmen. Mad Norwegian Press. ISBN 978-0975944691.
