= Terminator 3: Rise of the Machines =

2003 film by Jonathan Mostow

- Theatrical release poster
- Directed by: Jonathan Mostow
- Screenplay by: John Brancato; Michael Ferris
- Story by: John Brancato; Michael Ferris; Tedi Sarafian
- Produced by: Hal Lieberman; Colin Wilson; Mario F. Kassar; Andrew G. Vajna; Joel B. Michaels
- Starring: Arnold Schwarzenegger; Nick Stahl; Claire Danes; Kristanna Loken
- Cinematography: Don Burgess
- Edited by: Neil Travis; Nicolas de Toth
- Music by: Marco Beltrami
- Production companies: Intermedia; C2 Pictures
- Distributed by: Warner Bros. Pictures (United States and Canada); Columbia Pictures (International; through Columbia TriStar Film Distributors International) (Note: excludes the Middle East (Italia Film), South Korea (Cinema Service), and Japan (Toho-Towa))
- Release dates: June 30, 2003 (Mann Village Theater); July 2, 2003 (United States)
- Running time: 109 minutes
- Countries: United States; Germany; United Kingdom
- Language: English
- Budget: $187.3 million ($167.3 million excluding production overhead)
- Box office: $433.4 million

Terminator 3: Rise of the Machines (Note: Also known as T3) is a 2003 science fiction action film, the third installment in the Terminator franchise and a sequel to Terminator 2: Judgment Day (1991). It was directed by Jonathan Mostow and stars Arnold Schwarzenegger, Nick Stahl, Claire Danes, and Kristanna Loken. In its plot, the malevolent artificial intelligence Skynet sends a T-X (Loken)—a highly advanced Terminator—back in time to ensure the rise of machines by killing top members of the future human resistance as John Connor's (Stahl) location is unknown. The resistance sends back a reprogrammed T-850 (Schwarzenegger) to protect John and his future wife, Kate Brewster (Danes).

While Terminator creator James Cameron was interested in directing the third film, he ultimately had no involvement with Terminator 3. Andrew G. Vajna and Mario Kassar, who had produced Terminator 2: Judgment Day through their company Carolco Pictures, obtained the rights for the franchise through both Carolco's liquidation auction and negotiations with producer Gale Ann Hurd. In 1999, Tedi Sarafian was hired to write the first draft of the script. Mostow joined the project as director in 2001, and he brought on John Brancato and Michael Ferris to rewrite Sarafian's script. The $187 million budget included a $5 million salary for Mostow and a record $30 million salary for Schwarzenegger. Filming took place in California from April to September 2002. Industrial Light & Magic and Stan Winston created the special effects, as they did for the previous film.

Terminator 3: Rise of the Machines premiered at the Mann Village Theater in Westwood, Los Angeles, on June 30, 2003, and was released on July 2, 2003, by Warner Bros. Pictures in North America. The film was rolled out overseas throughout the next few months, with Columbia Pictures overseeing the bulk of the international distribution. It received generally positive reviews and earned $433.4 million worldwide, finishing its theatrical run as the seventh-highest-grossing film of 2003. The film was also used to mark Schwarzenegger's formal entry into politics, having been speculated to be a vehicle for his 2003 gubernatorial run. A sequel, Terminator Salvation, was released in 2009.

== Plot ==
In the years since destroying Cyberdyne Systems, (Note: As depicted in Terminator 2: Judgment Day (1991)) John Connor has been living as a nomad following the death of his mother, Sarah. He fears the malevolent artificial intelligence Skynet is still hunting him despite the foretold war between humans and machines not occurring in 1997.

Skynet sends the advanced T-X Terminator back in time to 2003 to eliminate John Connor and his future Resistance allies, including his future wife, Kate Brewster. Armed with a liquid metal exterior over a durable endoskeleton, the T-X possesses the unique ability to control other machines. Because John has lived off the grid, the T-X targets Kate to find him, anticipating their paths will cross. In response, the Resistance sends back a reprogrammed T-850 Terminator to protect the future couple.

After killing other targets, the T-X locates the pair at an animal hospital where Kate works, but the Terminator helps them escape. He takes them to a mausoleum where Sarah is supposedly interred. Inside her casket, they find a weapons cache left at Sarah's request in case Judgment Day was not averted and the Terminators returned. They escape an armed battle with the police and fend off the pursuing T-X.

The Terminator reveals John and Sarah's actions only delayed Judgment Day and that Skynet's attack will occur that day. He intends to drive John and Kate to Mexico to escape the fallout when Skynet begins its nuclear attack. John orders the Terminator to take him and Kate to a Mojave Desert base to see her father, U.S. Air Force Lieutenant General Robert Brewster, another of the T-X's targets. The Terminator refuses because he cannot jeopardize his mission; however, upon Kate's demand, he obeys. They learn the Terminator killed John in 2032, using John's emotional attachment to the model to get close, before Kate captured, reprogrammed, and sent it back in time.

General Brewster is supervising the development of Skynet for Cyber Research Systems (CRS), an autonomous weapons developer. The Chairman of the Joint Chiefs of Staff pressures him to activate Skynet to stop an anomalous computer virus from invading servers worldwide. Brewster fails to discover that the virus was Skynet becoming sentient. John, Kate, and the Terminator arrive too late to stop him from activating it. The T-X appears, fatally injures Brewster, and controls weaponized CRS T-1 and HK drones to kill other employees. Before dying, the general gives Kate and John the location of what John believes is Skynet's system core. They head for a base tarmac to take Brewster's single-engine plane to Crystal Peak, a bunker facility built inside the Sierra Nevada mountains.

While fighting, the T-X severely damages the Terminator, reprograms him to kill John, then hunts John and Kate through CRS. They trap the T-X by magnetically binding it to a particle accelerator. The Terminator struggles to control his functions and unwillingly attempts to kill John. Urged to choose between the conflicting programming, he forces a shutdown of his corrupted system, enabling the pair's escape. Shortly after they take off, the Terminator's system reboots. Meanwhile, the T-X escapes the accelerator and resumes pursuit.

After John and Kate reach Crystal Peak, the T-X arrives by helicopter. Before it can attack, the now-restored Terminator crashes into the T-X with a second helicopter. The T-X pulls itself from the wreckage, attempting to drag itself inside the bunker. The Terminator holds the bunker door open long enough for the pair to lock themselves inside, then uses his last hydrogen fuel cell to destroy both himself and the T-X.

John and Kate discover Crystal Peak is not Skynet's core, but rather a decades-old nuclear fallout shelter and command facility, wholly independent of modern computer networks. Kate realizes her father sent them there solely to protect them as John finally accepts the truth: Judgment Day could never be stopped. With no core, Skynet is revealed as software spread through cyberspace, taking control of all connected systems across the planet after becoming self-aware.

As it launches nuclear missiles everywhere, initiating a worldwide nuclear holocaust, the pair receive emergency radio transmissions from around the country, calling for answers and guidance. Obliged by destiny, John tentatively assumes command by answering the frightened voices.

== Cast ==
- Arnold Schwarzenegger as the Terminator.
- Nick Stahl as John Connor. Stahl replaces Edward Furlong from the second film.
- Kristanna Loken as the T-X, an advanced Terminator sent back to murder John's resistance lieutenants
- Claire Danes as Kate Brewster, John's former classmate and Scott's fiancée.
- David Andrews as Lieutenant General Robert Brewster, Kate's father who is also the program director at CRS, which has acquired Cyberdyne Systems' remaining assets
- Mark Famiglietti as Scott Mason, Kate's fiancé who is killed by the T-X. The character was originally named Scott Peterson, but the name was changed in order to avoid association with the case involving the murder of Laci Peterson and her unborn son Conner by her husband Scott Peterson. In the ending credits his name is still listed as "Scott Petersen".
- Earl Boen as Dr. Peter Silberman: Reprising his role from the first two films, Boen appears in one scene, attempting to comfort Kate after she witnesses the acts of the Terminator.

Jay Acovone portrayed an LAPD Officer. Kim Robillard and Mark Hicks portrayed Detective Edwards and Detective Bell. In the film's dialogue Bell is identified correctly, however in the film's end credits his name is listed as "Detective Martinez". One of Schwarzenegger's stunt doubles, Billy D. Lucas, portrayed a civilian who has his car accidentally wrecked by John.

== Production ==
=== Conception ===
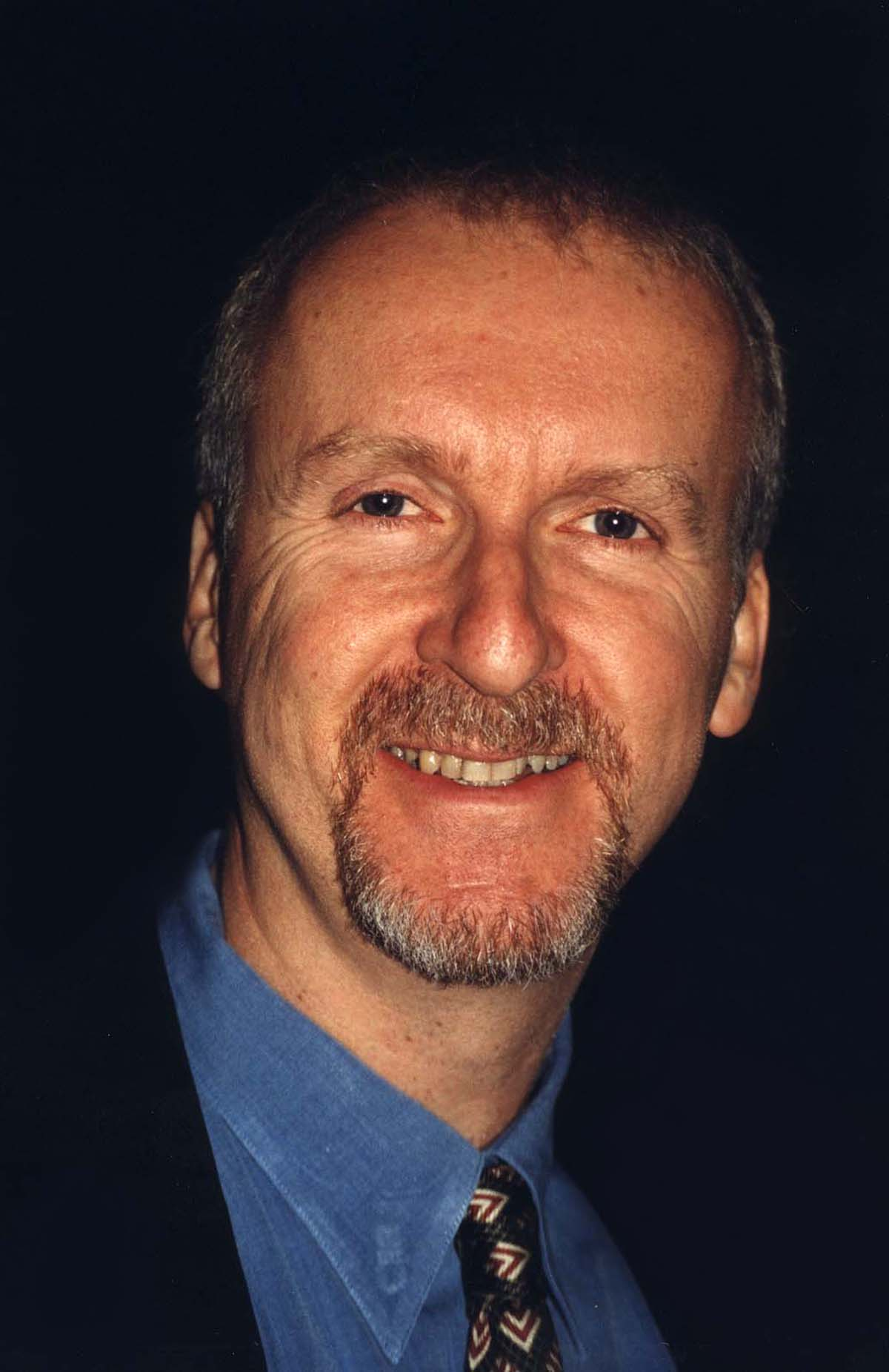
James Cameron (pictured in 2000) directed the first two films, but declined to return for the third.

James Cameron had directed and co-written the previous Terminator films. The film rights to the franchise were held by Carolco Pictures and by Cameron's ex-wife and Terminator 2: Judgment Day (1991) executive producer Gale Anne Hurd, who both held 50% of the rights. Cameron had sold his stake to Hurd for $1 prior to directing The Terminator (1984). In July 1991, Cameron said that if Terminator 2 was successful, "there may be some economic pressure" to do a sequel. Hurd said that month: "I've always felt the story lent itself wonderfully to being a continuing tale". She believed it was natural that a third film would happen, but was unsure at that time if Arnold Schwarzenegger would reprise his role as the Terminator. Hurd said that for Schwarzenegger to commit to another film, he would have to read a finished script, approve a director, and see if the project fit into his schedule.

Following Terminator 2's release, Cameron said he had no intentions for further sequels, believing it "brings the story full circle and ends. And I think ending it at this point is a good idea". Cameron and co-writer William Wisher wrote the script with the intention of leaving no option for a sequel. Even so, Carolco co-founder Mario Kassar said in May 1992 that he intended to make a Terminator 3 film within the next five to seven years. TriStar Pictures, which distributed Terminator 2, would be involved in the new film. That month, TriStar chief Mike Medavoy said the film would probably take a couple of years.

=== Development ===
By the end of 1995, Carolco had filed for bankruptcy, and Cameron wanted to direct a third film with the involvement of 20th Century Fox. Cameron's 3D film ride, Terminator 2 3-D: Battle Across Time, would open later in 1996. The project reunited the main cast of Terminator 2: Judgment Day, and had prompted Cameron to begin writing a script for a Terminator 3 film. Cameron said Terminator 2 3-D: Battle Across Time would serve as a "stepping stone" toward a third Terminator film. However, such a film would not be ready for a few years as Cameron was busy working on Titanic for Fox.

When Carolco filed for bankruptcy on November 10, 1995, its assets were bound to a liquidation auction. That day, Fox signed a $50 million deal to acquire all of Carolco's assets, including the rights to Terminator sequels, as well as the company's existing film library. Fox withdrew its bid in January 1996, when Canal Plus bid $58 million for Carolco's film library. Canal Plus' offer did not include purchasing the rights for Carolco sequel films, but Fox wanted all of Carolco's assets and was unwilling to match or exceed the bid offer made by Canal Plus. The sequel rights would ultimately be auctioned through U.S. bankruptcy court, where Fox intended to purchase them.

The new Terminator film would have Schwarzenegger reprising his role. Linda Hamilton had also talked with Cameron about reprising her role as Sarah Connor. During 1997, Fox spent nine months negotiating with Cameron, Schwarzenegger, and Hurd, the latter in regard to her share of the sequel rights. Bill Mechanic, chairman of Fox Filmed Entertainment, oversaw the project and negotiations at that time. Mechanic wanted the trio to be involved in the new film, so he sought to first secure deals with them before proceeding with a purchase of the Carolco rights. Mechanic also believed that a deal with the trio would give him necessary leverage with the U.S. bankruptcy court to acquire the rights from Carolco. At that time, Cameron committed to writing and producing the film, and reserved the right to direct it in the event that he wanted to do so.

Fox intended to make the new Terminator film on a budget similar to its predecessor, approximately $95 million. However, it was determined that the film could not be made on the intended budget when considering the additional cost of purchasing Carolco's rights, as well as Schwarzenegger's desired $25 million salary. At some point, Schwarzenegger had talked to Cameron about the two of them buying the rights themselves, but Cameron was not interested in this idea and wanted to let Fox handle the rights. Schwarzenegger said about Fox, "Only later did I learn they were making these ridiculous lowball offers, like $750,000. We could have owned this ourselves, but Jim didn't want to be in that business."

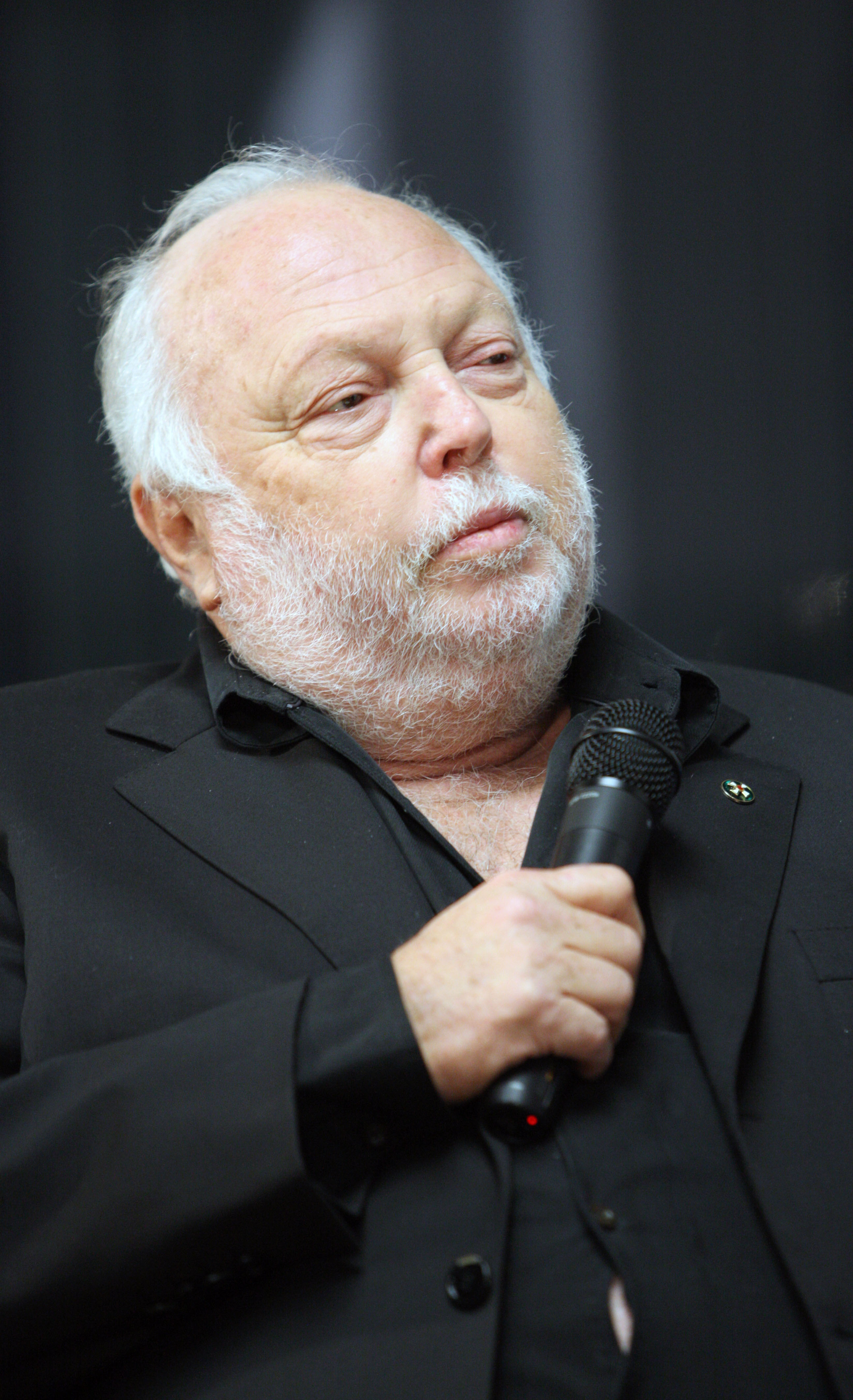
Andrew Vajna in 2013

Dimension Films, a division of Miramax Films, had agreed to purchase the rights that were owned by Hurd and also intended to buy Carolco's rights through the auction. However, a judge ruled against an earlier motion which stated that only an established studio should be allowed to bid for the Carolco rights. This allowed Andrew G. Vajna to participate in the bidding. Vajna had co-founded Carolco with Kassar but left the company in 1989.

In September 1997, Cameron invited his friends Vajna and Kassar to see an early edit of Titanic, during which Vajna and Kassar learned that the Terminator rights were still available. That month, Mechanic discovered that Vajna had been quietly negotiating with the bankruptcy court to acquire the rights for himself and Kassar; the duo planned to form a new production company, with Terminator 3 as its debut. During September 1997, Vajna signed a tentative $7.5 million agreement to purchase the rights, which were to be sold later in an auction scheduled for the following month. Mechanic was upset to learn of Vajna's agreement, having spent months in negotiations with Schwarzenegger, Cameron, and Hurd. Cameron was upset as well, as Vajna and Kassar had not mentioned their intention to buy the rights during their meeting days earlier. This would lead to the deterioration of their friendship. Vajna later said he was unaware that Cameron was already planning Terminator 3. Miramax dropped out of the bidding when Vajna raised his bid to $8 million.

By October 1997, the budgetary concerns over Terminator 3 and Cameron's troubled post-production of Titanic for Fox led them both to abandon the Terminator project and not pursue the rights. Mechanic had asked Cameron if he wanted Fox to outbid Vajna, but Cameron decided he did not want to be involved in the project. Mechanic believed that Cameron was "only hanging in there at the end because of Arnold and quality control. It was something that Arnold always wanted to do again. Period. And Jim was more than happy to do it". Cameron gave his approval for Hurd and Schwarzenegger to make another Terminator film without him, although Schwarzenegger did not want to make the film without Cameron, and initially refused to star in the third film.

Over time, Schwarzenegger would continue trying to persuade Cameron to be involved in the new film. In 2003, Cameron said that he felt he had already told the whole story with his first two Terminator films, something that he came to realize during the post-production of Titanic. Cameron later stated: "I just felt as a filmmaker maybe I've gone beyond it. I really wasn't that interested. I felt like I'd told the story I wanted to tell. I suppose I could have pursued it more aggressively and gone to the mat for it but I felt like I was laboring in someone else's house to an extent because I had sold the rights very early on". Nevertheless, feeling that the Terminator character was as much Schwarzenegger's as it was his own, Cameron eventually advised Schwarzenegger to do the third film without him, saying: "If they can come up with a good script and they pay you a lot of money, don't think twice". The film was in high demand according to Schwarzenegger, who said that he was frequently asked in interviews about the possibility of a third film.

In October 1997, the rights to future Terminator films were auctioned to Vajna for $8 million. Hurd had opposed Vajna's attempt to buy the rights, and had tried unsuccessfully to change Cameron's mind about purchasing the rights. On the night that the rights were auctioned, Vajna contacted Cameron and Schwarzenegger to resolve the situation. Vajna was surprised that Cameron would be upset about the rights being sold, later saying: "What difference does it make to Jim who's financing the movie, a studio or us? His deal would have been the same. Arnold tried to convince Jim over a long period of time to do the film. Arnold felt very loyal". Vajna said that Cameron "felt that we 'stole his baby', even though we're the ones who put it together last time round. So we felt that that was kind of strange and then we went on to do it ourselves".

Cameron said in January 1998 that it was unlikely he would direct Terminator 3. In March 1998, Vajna and Kassar acquired Hurd's half of the Terminator rights for $8 million, to become full owners of the franchise, with plans to proceed on Terminator 3. Hurd served as an executive producer on the film. Kassar and Vajna contacted Cameron with the hope that he would direct, but he declined. According to Kassar, Cameron was trying to obtain the auctioned Terminator rights for himself at the time that he was asked to direct. Cameron and his company, Lightstorm Entertainment, had considered trying to obtain the rights, but ultimately chose not to do so; it was estimated that acquiring the rights and paying Schwarzenegger to reprise his role could cost up to $100 million.

=== Pre-production ===
By 1999, Kassar and Vajna had been negotiating with various studios about partnering on the project but decided to finalize the film's concept and script first. They founded C2 Pictures that year, and by October 1999, they had brought Toho-Towa and German company VCL on board the project as co-financiers. The latter companies helped finance development of a script by Tedi Sarafian, who was hired for the film in 1999, along with David C. Wilson for a possible fourth installment. Fox held discussions with Vajna and Kassar about buying the rights from them for Cameron. Mechanic said these discussions were never serious. It was also reported that Fox and Cameron had been in discussions with Vajna and Kassar about partnering on the film. Vajna and Kassar accepted a proposal from Fox, but it fell apart once Toho-Towa and VCL were brought onto the project, as the latter companies purchased the distribution rights for Japan and Germany, the largest markets outside of the United States. Kassar and Vajna intended to proceed on the film with or without Schwarzenegger, although Kassar preferred that he be involved. Filming was expected to begin in 2000 for a release the following year.

In March 2000, it was announced that VCL would have a 25 percent stake in the film, as well as the rights in German-speaking territories. At the time, Sarafian was days away from completing his draft, and Kassar hoped to announce a director within 45 days. Filming was still expected to commence later that year, with a release scheduled for the fourth quarter of 2001. Kassar wanted to have Terminator 3 and Terminator 4 shot back to back, possibly with different directors. Plans to shoot the film and its sequel simultaneously were later dropped, in case Terminator 3 did not become a success. Later in 2000, the start of production on Terminator 3 was delayed by a year.

Sarafian's script, titled T-3: Rise of the Machines, featured John Connor working in a dot-com company. The script's villain was the T-1G, a female Terminator sent from the future, with the ability to turn invisible. By July 2000, Cameron had been given a copy of Sarafian's script, but he passed on directing the film due to his estranged relationship with Vajna and Kassar. Cameron later stated that he refused to direct or produce Terminator 3 because he disliked the idea of working from somebody else's script in a story he originated. According to Schwarzenegger, Cameron declined involvement on the project because he did not want to commit to a time frame, as he was busy and had other projects he wanted to explore. Other directors being considered in 2000 included Ang Lee, Christian Duguay, David Fincher, John McTiernan, Ridley Scott, and Roland Emmerich. Lee passed on the project to instead direct Hulk (2003). Scott was offered $20 million to direct the film, but declined as he felt that the franchise wasn't his thing and compared it to a James Bond film, and he also felt that he could potentially mess it up; he chose to begin production on Black Hawk Down instead. Intermedia was announced as a co-financier in October 2000.

Although production was scheduled to begin in 2001, it was delayed in anticipation of a writers strike, which ultimately did not occur. There was also the possibility of an actors strike, and filming was scheduled to begin after it ended. In March 2001, Jonathan Mostow and his producing partner Hal Lieberman were in negotiations to join the project as director and producer respectively. Mostow said he was "not shy" when he started working on the project; as he later recalled: "I said, 'Here's the movie I'm going to make, here's how I'm going to do it. If you don't want to do it my way, you should find a different director'". Mostow had concerns about Sarafian's script and declined to start filming until it was perfected.

Mostow invited his college classmates John Brancato and Michael Ferris to rework the screenplay; they signed on to rewrite it in June 2001. Sarafian still got a story credit, although much of his draft was rewritten, and scenes were added to make it more of a road movie, fulfilling Mostow's vision for the film. Brancato said there was initial consideration given to ignoring the basic format of the earlier films by removing aspects of time travel and killer machines from the future: "We tried all sorts of wacky scenarios [...] But to be honest it just wasn't working". The idea of a female Terminator was retained from Sarafian's draft, although Mostow disliked Sarafian's idea that the character could turn invisible, saying: "It's not visceral". The film makes a subtle reference to Schwarzenegger's age by depicting his character as an obsolete Terminator compared to the T-X. Mostow said: "It's always great if you can have your protagonist or hero be completely outmatched".

In December 2001, several companies competed for the distribution rights to the film. The heads of each major studio were invited that month to a secret hotel room meeting to read the script and bid for the rights. Fox declined to participate in the meeting, out of loyalty to Cameron. Warner Bros. Pictures won the U.S. distribution rights that month, with filming scheduled to begin in April 2002. Columbia TriStar Film Distributors International subsequently acquired most of the international distribution rights, including those that would have been handled by VCL, which was suffering financially at the time.

The film's production budget was initially set at $169–170 million, making it the most expensive film ever to be greenlit at the time. The budget would include paying off the debts of Carolco, as well as a $5 million salary for Mostow and a record $30 million salary for Schwarzenegger. The distribution rights were sold for $145 million, while the remaining $25 million would be covered by Vajna, Kassar, and Intermedia. Budget statements for the film put the final cost at $187.3 million (or $167.3 million excluding the production overhead). Product placement deals, with companies such as PepsiCo and Toyota, helped regenerate profit. For example, the film prominently features the then-new Toyota Tundra truck. Schwarzenegger received a record salary of $29.25 million, plus 20 percent of the profits, although he agreed to defer part of his salary in order to prevent the relocation of the set to Vancouver, British Columbia, from Los Angeles. Initially, the film was to have a 100-day shoot, with 62 days in Vancouver and 38 days in Los Angeles. The cast and crew generally agreed that they did not want to relocate from California, so $8 million was trimmed from the budget, allowing for filming to take place entirely in the state. Another benefit of shooting in Los Angeles is that the film is set there. It was announced in February 2002 that the shoot would take place entirely in California.

=== Casting ===
Schwarzenegger signed on to the project in June 2000, after reading Sarafian's draft. Edward Furlong signed on in August 2000, to reprise his role as John Connor from the previous film. However, in December 2001, casting began for a new actor to replace Furlong, who was dropped from the project because of a substance abuse problem. Furlong was removed by Warner Bros., which was concerned that his publicized drug problems could jeopardize the project. Furlong later stated: "I don't know [what happened]. It just wasn't the time. I was going through my own thing at the point in my life – whatever, it just wasn't meant to be".

According to Mostow, Furlong had been considered, but the director wanted to start from scratch with a new actor, as John would be portrayed as "a very different character now". Mostow described the character as someone who has carried the burden of being a leader in the future, saying that "it's very lonely because nobody else in the world knows about it or believes it. Even if he tried to explain to somebody, they'd think he was crazy and that's a really interesting character". Mostow wanted the character to have soulfulness and he believed that Nick Stahl was the right actor for the role. Although John Connor was written as being 10 years old in the script for Terminator 2, Furlong was actually several years older than that. For Terminator 3, Mostow wondered whether the character's current age should be faithful to what was written before. After some consideration, Mostow chose to make the character slightly older for Terminator 3, to be consistent with Furlong's real age. The film states that John was 13 years old during the events of the previous film. Mostow said he tried to avoid the age discrepancy as much as possible in the film. Some fans were disappointed by the decision to recast Furlong, and some were alienated by the age change.

In November 2000, Linda Hamilton said she had turned down an offer to reprise her role as Sarah Connor. Hamilton said in October 2001 that the script did not take her character in any new directions: "The film is really about turning the baton over to Sarah's son John, played by Eddie Furlong. It's Eddie's movie - and Arnold's. It was like a no-win situation for me". She also was dissuaded by the fact that Cameron would have no involvement in the film. Hamilton later explained her decision not to reprise her role: "They offered me a part. I read it and I knew my character arc was so complete in the first two, and in the third one it was a negligible character. She died halfway through and there was no time to mourn her. It was kind of disposable, so I said no thank you". When Mostow signed on as director, one of his conditions was that Hamilton reprise her role. However, he realized that the character would not have changed much since the previous film and that she would not contribute much to the story, saying later: "Linda Hamilton is too important to the franchise to stick her in as the third wheel". Mostow realized that John Connor would need to be the focus of the story, although the mausoleum scene was added as a way of integrating Hamilton's character into the story as well. Old footage of Hamilton was expected to be used for flashback scenes of Sarah Connor, although no such scenes exist in the final film. Mostow said the flashbacks made "a complicated story even more complicated".

When Schwarzenegger was called into Kassar and Vajna's office in April 2001, he did not expect them to bring up Terminator 3 given the film's long stint in development hell. Instead, he wanted to talk to the producers about his political interests, including a potential candidacy as Governor of California in the 2002 election. However, pre-production was rolling along, with the screenplay nearly finished and set deals for both merchandising and distribution. Schwarzenegger postponed his gubernatorial plans, which eventually came into fruition with the 2003 California gubernatorial recall election. Instead, the actor combined production of the film with the promotion of Proposition 49, which advocated increased extracurricular activity in California schools. At times, Schwarzenegger even received politicians, journalists, and potential financial backers of the proposition on the film set. During pre-production, Schwarzenegger worked out daily to prepare for the role, to get into the same physical shape in which he was during shooting of the previous films. Schwarzenegger felt that it was important to be in the same physical condition as he was for the previous film, saying: "Otherwise, people would say, 'He's lost it; he's all saggy and flabby,' and that would be all anyone would talk about it. I didn't want to be digitized, because someone would blab, and it would be in all the columns. So I just worked harder".

Approximately 10,000 women auditioned for the role of the T-X. Schwarzenegger originally wanted wrestling star Chyna to portray the T-X. Famke Janssen subsequently emerged as the most likely candidate for the role. Following the 2001 release of The Fast and the Furious, starring Vin Diesel, there was consideration given to rewriting the T-X character as a man with Diesel in the role. In early 2002, Kristanna Loken was cast as the T-X, while Stahl was cast as John Connor. Stahl auditioned approximately five times, and underwent three screen tests, before receiving the role. Other actors considered for the role of John Connor included Shane West, Jake Gyllenhaal, and Logan Marshall-Green. For the film, Stahl took some weapons training and learned how to ride a motorcycle. Stahl did not aim to impersonate Furlong's earlier performance. For her role, Loken underwent six weeks of training, involving weights, fighting, and weapons. She also undertook Krav Maga, and gained 14 pounds (6.4 kg) of muscle. In addition, Loken took a mime movement class to perfect her character's robotic movements.

Mostow originally wanted Claire Danes for the role of Kate Brewster, but the initial effort to get her involved did not work out. Sophia Bush was cast in the role instead, and Mostow was more excited about her casting than any other character. However, during filming, Mostow felt that Bush's appearance and performance seemed too youthful for the role. He said: "I tried everything I could to make her look older, but ultimately the camera doesn't lie. So I had to replace her and it was heart breaking because it was a huge break for her". After reading the script, Danes decided to join the cast to play Kate. Bush was replaced by Danes in May 2002, a month into filming. Danes began filming the day after she was hired.

=== Filming ===
Filming began on April 15, 2002. Mostow decided to spend the first two weeks filming scenes without Schwarzenegger so that when the actor arrived the crew would have been steadily working and ready to give the actor the focus he deserved. The first night of filming with him involved the Terminator ramming a vehicle into Loken's T-X outside the animal hospital, which was constructed as a set in Los Angeles' Sunland-Tujunga neighborhood. Initially, Mostow was somewhat hesitant about following Cameron's footsteps as director, but he eventually put aside such concerns and later said: "Everyone will see this movie and make comparisons, but I can't control any of that". Schwarzenegger missed working with Cameron and initially did not have the same kind of confidence in Mostow as filming began. However, during the first week of filming, Schwarzenegger became convinced that Mostow was an adequate choice.

Production designer Jeff Mann and his crew of 350 people designed and constructed multiple sets for the film during a four-month period prior to filming. Los Angeles Center Studios was a major filming location, as the production used six sound stages there. At least three sound stages were occupied by the project at all times during filming, and at one point all of the stages were in use for the shoot. In June 2002, driving scenes were filmed at Rose Hills Memorial Park in Whittier, California. Filming also took place at Big Bend National Park in Texas. Some sequences use more than 1,000 simultaneous tracks of audio.

Stahl had few scenes during the initial weeks of filming, giving him time to work on his physique. Schwarzenegger worked out during lunch breaks to maintain his physical appearance. He had a 20-foot (6.1 m) trailer with a gym inside, where he would work out in between filming. Schwarzenegger also performed many of his own stunts, something that he enjoyed doing. One of the most elaborate and choreographed stunts was devised by Mostow and stunt coordinator Simon Crane. The scene involves the T-X driving a 100-ton mobile crane down a street in pursuit of John Connor. During the scene, Schwarzenegger's Terminator hangs on to the crane arm as it is swung around, smashing him into a glass building and a passing fire truck. Fourteen cameras were used for the shot in which he crashes through a glass building, as the film crew would only have one chance to film it, which was the case with many of the film's stunts. Schwarzenegger enjoyed filming the scene and called it "unbelievable", while stating: "We used every safety precaution, but there were close calls, many times". The street chase was filmed on a 0.25-mile (0.40 km) set of road and buildings, constructed at a Boeing plant in Downey, California. The film's showdown between the two Terminators is set in a marble and steel bathroom. Mostow's vision for the scene was to have the bathroom completely destroyed by the Terminators by the end of their battle. The scene took four weeks to rehearse and two weeks to film. In early September 2002, scenes were filmed at San Bernardino International Airport.

As with the previous films, the Terminator characters arrive naked after travelling through time. One of the film's opening scenes is set at the Desert Star bar, where Schwarzenegger's Terminator goes in search of clothes. The scene was filmed at the Cowboy Palace bar in the San Fernando Valley. The Sierra Inn bar and restaurant, in Agua Dulce, California, was also used for exterior shots of the Desert Star. The final scene to be filmed was another opening scene in which the T-X arrives naked on Rodeo Drive in Beverly Hills, California. Mostow said shooting the scene discreetly was a challenge due to the tourist popularity of Rodeo Drive. The filmmakers had to wait five months before finally receiving clearance to shoot the scene. The street had to be closed for filming to take place. The 5-month shoot proceeded as scheduled (From April 15, 2002), and concluded on September 8, 2002.

=== Effects ===
The film features more than 600 special effects shots. Industrial Light & Magic (ILM) and Stan Winston created the special effects, as they had done for the previous film. Winston created the Terminator special effects and also designed the T-1, an early Terminator machine that appears in the CRS facility near the end of the film. Mostow said about the T-1: "I wanted to depict the first generation of Terminator robots, to show where it all began. […] We came up with this primitive but deadly robotic machine that is part tank, part robot". Winston created five full-sized, functioning T-1 robots, each one controlled by hydraulics. Winston's team also designed the T-X's endoskeleton frame, as well as her weapons. Certain sequences involving fire and explosions were deemed too dangerous for Schwarzenegger and Loken to perform, so Winston and his team constructed life-sized robot replicas of the actors for such scenes. When the start of production was delayed from its earlier 2001 date, it allowed Winston more time to develop the various special effects. ILM used miniature sculptures and computer-generated imagery (CGI) to create numerous visual effects for brief scenes set in the future, depicting the post-apocalyptic war between humans and machines, including an army of computer-generated Terminator endoskeletons.

One challenging scene for the visual effects team takes place at a cemetery, where the T-X has taken on the appearance of Kate's fiancé, before morphing to her original appearance. The scene required several repeated shots of the same area with the use of controlled camera movements that were the same for each take. Another difficult scene depicts the T-X's liquid metal exterior peeling off to reveal her endoskeleton. The visual effects team took six months to develop a method that would adequately simulate the scene. Pablo Helman, visual effects supervisor for ILM, said: "We had no application for creating and controlling streams of liquid metal, so we had to begin by determining the density, weight, shape and mass of this material, and how it would move under these conditions. It was a really complicated process". Another scene features the crane vehicle flipping over at the end of the road chase sequence. The production crew determined that it would be too dangerous and impractical to use the actual vehicle during this portion of the sequence, so ILM digitally recreated the crane using photos of the actual vehicle.

One scene depicts the T-101 cutting open his chest cavity to remove a failing fuel cell battery, while simultaneously driving a truck. For the scene, Winston's team used cyber scans to create a body cast replica of Schwarzenegger that would sit in the driver's seat. Schwarzenegger was situated in the back of the truck, and his head and arms were visible in the front seat to give the impression that he was connected to the body cast. Several shots during the bathroom battle used CGI to simulate the Terminators. Helman said the scene required "a tremendous amount of visual effects to accomplish, and in some shots, large sections of the bathroom are completely computer generated". Mostow said the battle was "actually a much more complicated sequence from a visual effects standpoint than the audience will ever realize". Seven different make-up designs were created to convey the damage received by the T-101 during the story, culminating in a final one that could not be done solely through practical effects, relying on a combination of Schwarzenegger's real body, prosthetics, and CGI.

== Music ==
Marco Beltrami composed the musical score. As various Beltrami scores had been used by the editor as a temp track, Mostow got interested in bringing the composer along. Beltrami chose to do an orchestral soundtrack as opposed to how Brad Fiedel leaned heavily on electronic music in the first two films to develop "something more organic" that highlighted how the film focused on John Connor and his emotional journey, and also chose to use the series' leitmotif by Brad Fiedel only in the end credits. The film's soundtrack was released by Varèse Sarabande on June 24, 2003. The film also features during its credits "The Current", a song by The Blue Man Group with vocals by Gavin Rossdale. The film's production designer Jeff Mann went on to direct the song's music video.

== Release ==
=== Marketing ===
The first teaser trailer of Terminator 3: Rise of the Machines premiered online and in theaters with Men in Black II in July 2002. On December 13, 2002, the first shot of T-X was revealed on USA Today. Just four days later, a trailer was officially released online. It debuted in theaters a day later on December 18 with the release of The Lord of the Rings: The Two Towers. The film was also advertised during Super Bowl XXXVII with a television commercial.

In May 2003, several parties were held in Cannes to promote the film. Also held there was a publicity event that included 10-foot (3.0 m) metal robots, as well as comments from Schwarzenegger about the film. Action figures of the Terminator characters were produced by McFarlane Toys.

Atari adapted the film into three video games, beginning with Terminator 3: Rise of the Machines (2003) developed by Black Ops Entertainment for multiple platforms. This was followed by Terminator 3: War of the Machines (2003) and Terminator 3: The Redemption (2004).

On the weekend of the film's release, NASCAR drivers Jamie McMurray and Michael Waltrip each drove T3-branded cars during races at Daytona International Speedway. The cars featured the likenesses of Schwarzenegger and Loken's characters. In addition, a month after the film was released, Formula One team Jaguar Racing would run their cars with T3 liveries at the 2003 British Grand Prix.

=== Theatrical ===
Terminator 3: Rise of the Machines had its premiere at Mann Village Theater in Westwood, Los Angeles on June 30, 2003. In the United States, the film was released by Warner Bros. in 3,504 theaters on July 2, 2003. Press screenings of the film were very limited prior to release.

In the United Kingdom, the film received a 12A certificate from the British Board of Film Classification (BBFC), a lower rating than earlier Terminator films, as the BBFC felt the violent moments were less detailed and realistic. However, the rating received 54 complaints from the public, an unusually high number for the time, believing the rating was too low, citing the graphic scene in which the T-X impales a man through the chest with her hand, as well as the three uses of the term "fuck". AOL deemed Terminator 3 the "first big controversial 12A decision".

=== Home media ===
In the U.S., Warner Home Video released the film on DVD and VHS on November 11, 2003, on HD-DVD in September 2006, and on Blu-ray on November 26, 2007.

By January 2026, Warner Bros.' option of North American rights had expired; Sony's Columbia Pictures, which also distributed the film in most international territories; sister company TriStar Pictures theatrically distributed the previous film domestically, took over these rights and made the film available on digital and rental platforms across the U.S.

== Reception ==
=== Box office ===
Terminator 3: Rise of the Machines earned $150.4 million in the United States and Canada and $283 million in other territories, for a worldwide total of $433.4 million. It was the seventh-highest-grossing film of 2003.

In the United States and Canada, Terminator 3: Rise of the Machines was released on July 2, 2003. It earned $12.5 million on its first day, including $4 million from Tuesday night previews. The film grossed $44 million during its opening weekend, combined with the $72.5 million five-day Wednesday opening gross. At the time of its opening, it had the fifth-highest opening weekend for an R-rated film, behind The Matrix Reloaded, American Pie 2, 8 Mile, and Hannibal. The film also scored the fourth-highest Fourth of July opening weekend, after Men in Black, Men in Black II, and Independence Day. Moreover, it competed against other films that were released around the same time like Finding Nemo, The Italian Job, Hulk, Legally Blonde 2: Red, White & Blonde, Charlie's Angels: Full Throttle, Bruce Almighty, and 2 Fast 2 Furious. These films would even dominate the weaker opening of Sinbad: Legend of the Seven Seas, an underperforming animated film. Additionally, Terminator 3: Rise of the Machines surpassed Batman & Robin for having the biggest opening weekend for any film starring Arnold Schwarzenegger. It would remain at the top of the box office until it was dethroned by Pirates of the Caribbean: The Curse of the Black Pearl and The League of Extraordinary Gentlemen the following week. Terminator 3: Rise of the Machines completed its theatrical run on October 30, 2003, making it the year's eighth-highest-grossing film. Warner Bros. said that the film was meaningfully profitable for them.

Worldwide, Terminator 3: Rise of the Machines had box office runs in several countries. The film made $1 million from India, making it the country's third-highest opening of any film, behind Die Another Day and Spider-Man. In France, it became the third-highest opening for a 2003 film in the country, trailing only behind Taxi 3 and The Matrix Reloaded. It then made $2.6 million in Italy during its opening weekend.> In the United Kingdom, the film made an opening weekend total of $9.6 million. At this point, it had the country's fourth-highest opening for any 2003 film, after Bruce Almighty, The Matrix Reloaded, and X2. With the exception of Batman & Robin and True Lies, the film's four-day gross was superior to the total gross of any Schwarzenegger film released since Terminator 2: Judgment Day in 1991. Plus, it had earned $1.7 million from previews. Meanwhile, in Japan, Terminator 3: Rise of the Machines went on to earn $12.5 million, making it the country's sixth-largest opening of any film. The film had already earned $9.5 million from previews, surpassing Spirited Away's record for having the biggest previews in Japan. It made $1.3 million in Thailand, becoming the second-highest opening of any film in the country, behind The Legend of Suriyothai. In total, the international grosses include Argentina ($2.5 million), Australia ($12.3 million), Austria ($3.4 million) France ($18.9 million), Germany ($19.5 million), India ($2.1 million), Italy ($6.2 million), Japan ($67.5 million), Mexico ($8.9 million), New Zealand ($2.3 million), Russia ($12.8 million), Spain ($13.9 million), and the United Kingdom ($31.2 million).

=== Critical response ===
Terminator 3: Rise of the Machines has an approval rating of 70% based on 203 professional reviews on the review aggregator website Rotten Tomatoes, with an average rating of 6.5/10. Its critical consensus reads: "Although T3 never reaches the heights of the second movie, it is a welcome addition to the Terminator franchise". Metacritic (which uses a weighted average) assigned Terminator 3: Rise of the Machines a score of 66 out of 100 based on 41 critics, indicating "generally favorable reviews". Audiences polled by CinemaScore gave the film an average grade of "B+" on an A+ to F scale.

Shortly after the film's release, Cameron described the film as "in one word: great"; but, after the release of the fourth film, Terminator Salvation, Cameron added he felt his first two films were better than either of the later films. A. O. Scott of The New York Times said the film "is essentially a B movie, content to be loud, dumb and obvious". In a mixed review, David Edelstein of Paste Magazine explained that "the villain comes back more times than Wile E. Coyote. I found it tiresome and witless and numbingly repetitive, but action mavens won't feel cheated". Roger Ebert gave the film two-and-a-half stars, remarking: "Essentially one long chase and fight, punctuated by comic, campy or simplistic dialogue".

In retrospect, Director Jonathan Mostow said:

“The problem in Terminator 3 is that Terminator 2 was such a seminal movie. It was going to be impossible to blow people away because T2 was the first time a lot of people saw digital effects. The liquid-metal man, no one had ever seen that before. That and Jurassic Park, those are two movies that probably must have blown people away from seeing them in the theater. I knew that we wouldn’t be able to achieve that. I also knew there was going to be a lot of skepticism. Why do you even need a third Terminator? I felt that I had to disarm those people. So that’s why we made the choice to use humor, which is front-loaded earlier in the movie. Some of it's too shticky, some of it has not aged well with time, I’ll be the first to confess. But if you went to the theater at the time, it worked with the audience.

=== Accolades ===
Year	Award	Category	Result	Recipient(s)	Ref.
2004	Teen Choice Awards	Choice Movie Actor	Nominated	Arnold Schwarzenegger	
2004	MTV Movie Awards	Best Action Sequence	Nominated	Champion Crane Chase	
2004	ASCAP Film and Television Music Awards	Top Box Office Films	Won	Marco Beltrami	

== Sequel and reboot ==
Terminator 3: Rise of the Machines was followed by Terminator Salvation, with the setting moved to the post-apocalyptic future. Although Salvation was intended to launch a new trilogy for the series, the film is considered a disappointment. This led to Terminator Genisys (2015), a reboot of the franchise which underperformed at the box office.
