= Terminator 3: War of the Machines =

2003 first-person shooter video game

- North American PC cover art
- Developer: Clever's Games
- Publisher: Atari
- Designers: Adám Regényi; Gyula Pozsgay
- Programmer: Tamás Schlägl
- Artists: Szabolcs Pénzes; Zoltán Pócza
- Composer: Szabó Gábor Dénes
- Platform: Windows
- Release: UK: November 28, 2003; NA: December 3, 2003; AU: December 5, 2003
- Genre: First-person shooter
- Modes: Single-player, multiplayer

Terminator 3: War of the Machines is a 2003 first-person shooter video game based on the film Terminator 3: Rise of the Machines. It was developed by Hungarian developer Clever's Games and published by Atari for Microsoft Windows. The game is set in a post-apocalyptic future when human and machine forces are battling for the world, and the player chooses which side to join. The game was negatively received, particularly for its character animations and artificial intelligence. Critics also viewed the game as a poor imitation of Battlefield 1942.

== Gameplay ==
Terminator 3: War of the Machines is a first-person shooter game with a focus on online multiplayer. The game takes place during a post-apocalyptic war between Skynet's Terminator machines and the Tech-Com human team. The player chooses which team to join, and each character is labeled with their team affiliation to inform other players. Three game modes are featured: the online multiplayer Team Deathmatch mode; the objective-based Mission mode, in which players hold or overrun an area; and Termination, which is a single-player mode played against bots as the player tries to capture an enemy base.

Tech-Com's humans have a variety of weapons, and Skynet's machines have their own weapons as well. Vehicles are located in each level and may be used by the human players, although they cannot take command of a Skynet tank, which is only available to the machine players. The game includes levels based on present-day locations from Terminator 3: Rise of the Machines, as well as levels set during the future war. Some levels are set in the same location, but during different time periods, with only minimal differences between the two.

== Development and release ==
Terminator 3: War of the Machines was announced on June 19, 2003, as a 32-player online first-person shooter game based on the film Terminator 3: Rise of the Machines. It was developed by Hungary-based Clever's Games, and was published by Atari. The game features the likeness and voice of Arnold Schwarzenegger, reprising his role as the T-850.

The game was released in 2003 in the United Kingdom on November 28, in North American on December 3, in Australia on December 5, and in Japan the following year on March 12, 2004.

== Reception ==
Reception

Aggregate score
Aggregator	Score
Metacritic	25/100

Review scores
Publication	Score
Computer Gaming World	1.5/5
GameSpot	2/10
GameSpy	1/5
PC Format	34%
PC Gamer (UK)	40%
PC Gamer (US)	21%
PC Zone	4.9/10

Terminator 3: War of the Machines was poorly received by critics, who considered the game to be a poor imitation of Battlefield 1942. Some criticized the graphics, while Jamie Madigan of GameSpy considered them and the sound to be only average. The character animations, including death animations, received some criticism. Madigan called the animations "stilted and seemingly incomplete." Bob Colayco of GameSpot compared the death animations to the act of pushing a mannequin over: "When you kill an enemy, it stiffly falls over on its back or face." Colayco said that this may be "excusable" for killing machines, but that it did not make sense for humans to also die in the same manner.

Colayco also criticized the sound, as well as the level designs, writing that "many pathways lead to dead ends, which creates a lot of wasted space on the maps." Madigan wrote that the levels are full of "pointless dead ends, long stretches of mundane terrain, dry land, and not much that keeps you interested." Norman Chan of PC Gamer believed the levels were too small in design, and was critical of the fact that several levels are minor variations of each other set in different time periods.

Criticism also went to the game's artificial intelligence, which Madigan cited as a reason the game was not fun, writing, "Enemies will often run right past you and into danger." Some criticized the limited online servers. Madigan stated that with the "inaccessible" multiplayer and "deeply flawed" single-player modes, "It's a game that feels incomplete and practically abandoned by its publisher." Criticism was also directed at the lack of story. John Walker of PC Format criticized the poor controls, and William O'Neal of Computer Gaming World criticized the slow and unwieldy vehicles. Madigan was critical of the limited game options, and Chan felt the game modes were uninspired. In addition, because each player is labeled with their team affiliation, Chan believed that this resulted in a wasted opportunity for Terminator players to infiltrate the human force.
