= T-X =

Robotic antagonist of "Terminator 3: Rise of the Machines"

- Terminator character
- Kristanna Loken as the T-X in Terminator 3: Rise of the Machines (2003)
- First appearance: Terminator 3: Rise of the Machines (2003)
- Last appearance: Terminator Hunt (2004)
- Created by: John Brancato; Michael Ferris; Tedi Sarafian; Stan Winston
- Portrayed by: Kristanna Loken
- Voiced by: Kristanna Loken (video games)

In-universe information
- Alias: Terminatrix
- Species: Gynoid
- Occupation: Assassin
- Manufacturer: Skynet
- Model: T-X

The T-X (referred to as the Terminatrix in some appearances until other terminatrices, female terminators, appeared) is the name of a fictional cyborg assassin who appears in the Terminator franchise. The T-X model is a gynoid assassin and infiltrator. The character was introduced as the main antagonist in the 2003 film Terminator 3: Rise of the Machines, portrayed by Kristanna Loken. T-X has the ability to assume the appearance of other characters. This ability to shapeshift is similar to that of the T-1000, the main antagonist of Terminator 2: Judgment Day. T-X also has the ability to scan DNA from blood samples it puts on its tongue.

== Concept and design ==
"We were trying to come up with something that could hold its ground with the original Terminator. That was such an iconic figure- coming up with something that looked even more fantastic when next to the original Terminator was one of the biggest design challenges on the show."
— John Rosengrant

T-X in its default form

The T-X was designed by Stan Winston and his studio team, where it was considered particularly challenging to design, as the script required a character capable of holding its own against the original Terminator, known in the film as a T-800. Originally, the T-X's endoskeleton was meant to convey an androgynous shape which would permit the android to assume the superficial traits of both men and women, though later designs veered on it being more feminine. The final, approved T-X design was done by Aaron Sims, who designed it entirely on computer through a mixture of Adobe Photoshop and 3D modelling software. The T-X endoskeleton was painted chrome black, in order to differentiate it from the silver sheen of the T-850 endoskeleton, and fitted with blue running lights rather than the original's red. John Rosengrant later stated that the individual parts of the T-X endoskeleton were hard coated, sanded and polished through machines, resulting in a mathematically perfect model, unlike the endoskeleton in The Terminator, which was sculpted by hand and lacked symmetry.

The T-X is designed to not only terminate humans, but also rogue Terminators reprogrammed by the Resistance, an "anti-terminator terminator" as stated by John Connor. It is a composite of the T-800 and T-1000, combining the former's solid endoskeleton covered with the latter's liquid metal "mimetic polyalloy", allowing it to take the shape of any humanoid it touches. Because it is only coated in this material, it is possible to remove it from the endoskeleton using immensely strong magnetic force, such as that from a cyclic particle accelerator. Having a solid endoskeleton did solve some of the T-1000's problems, namely being deformed by temperature extremes and explosives while also lacking built-in ranged weaponry. However, the endoskeleton makes the T-X less flexible than its T-1000 predecessor, in that the T-X does not have the ability to liquefy and assume forms in innovative and surprising ways, including fitting through narrow openings, morphing its arms into solid metal tools or bladed weapons, walking through prison bars, or flattening itself. The T-X contains a large arsenal of advanced weapons from the future, including plasma cannons and flamethrowers - though it is strong enough to impale a human through the chest with its bare hand. This was the first time that Skynet was able to send more advanced weapons back in time, as the inability of anything not covered in human flesh to go back in time prevented it, but T-X's hybrid design of a solid endoskeleton with a shapeshifting liquid metal surface enabled this workaround.

Although the official novelization of Terminator 2 expanded the origin of the T-1000 and reveals it had onboard nanotechnology (and programmable memory) that was capable of scanning the molecular structure of anything the T-1000 touched, the T-X has a built-in supply of more advanced nanobots in its fingers, which it can inject into other machines, giving it remote control. An onboard plasma reactor powers all of the T-X's systems.

Loken had to gain over 15 pounds of muscle to portray the T-X. She was also trained by mime coach Thorsten Heinze, a long-time collaborator of famous mime Marcel Marceau, to develop a robotic style of moving.

== Film appearance ==
The T-X is the main antagonist in the 2003 film Terminator 3: Rise of the Machines.

It was sent back in time by Skynet to eliminate John Connor's future lieutenants and ensure that Skynet will rise without any interference. Her targets include John’s future wife, Kate Brewster—whose destiny ensures their paths will cross—and Kate's father, Robert, who is the primary creator of Skynet. The T-X arrives outside of a store, kills a woman, steals her clothes, car, and identity. It then kills a police officer who pulls her over, and locates and terminates three of its targets.

When it tracks down Kate Brewster in a veterinary hospital, it locates John Connor and makes him its primary target. As it interrogates Kate, a T-850, which was sent to protect the T-X's targets, arrives and rescues John and Kate. After a chase, the T-X kills Kate's fiancé and impersonates him. It almost succeeds in killing Kate, but John and the Terminator arrive and rescue her. The T-X chases them through a cemetery, but fails to kill them, with the Terminator destroying its plasma cannon with a missile launcher. Unbeknownst to the T-X, John Connor personally coins the machine as a "Terminatrix" based on it having a dominatrix figure.

Proceeding with its secondary mission, the T-X infiltrates Cyber Research Systems and activates the division's weaponized machines, which kill most of the employees. The T-X succeeds in killing Robert Brewster and ensuring Skynet's rise. After a fight with the T-850, it pursues John and Kate to Crystal Peak, a military base. Just as it prepares to kill them, the T-850 arrives in a helicopter and crashes into the T-X. The T-X, with her endoskeleton broken in half and revealed, crawls and pursues John. The T-850 grabs it and puts his last hydrogen fuel cell into the mouth of the T-X, destroying both androids in the process. Though it failed to kill John and Kate, the T-X succeeded in securing Skynet's rise.

== Literature ==
The 2003 comic series Terminator 3: Eyes of the Rise depicts the events of Terminator 3: Rise of the Machines from the perspective of the T-X, detailing how it was prepared for its mission before being sent back in time, what its thoughts were during the events of the film, additionally revealing that the T-X survives the film's conclusion in its liquid metal form, albeit no longer being able to take solid form due to a lack of solid material, bar forming a face after John Connor and Kate Brewster have left their bunker to smile at the beginning of Judgment Day.

In the 2004 novel Terminator Hunt, a second T-X is trained by captured resistance members for a jump to the 1960s where she will track the Connor family for the next forty years. A captured resistance soldier, Paul Keeley, is tricked into helping make the T-X more human. An implant in his brain causes him to think that the T-X is a girl named Eliza, and his interaction with her helps her learn how to be human. The resistance captures the T-X and rescues Keeley. But Eliza uses the implant to make Keeley think they have been captured by a rogue government, and he frees her. Overburdened with guilt, Keeley convinces John and Katherine Connor to give him another chance to capture Eliza. Through the implant, Paul discovers the training facility she has escaped to, and Eliza is again captured by the resistance and reprogrammed to serve it.

== Reception ==
Loken was praised for her performance, which was described as "formidable", even by critics who were not impressed with the film. She was nominated for Best Supporting Actress and Cinescape Genre Face of the Future Award at the 30th Saturn Awards.
