= Terminator Salvation: The Machinima Series =

- Genre: Action; Adventure; Military science fiction
- Written by: Andy Shapiro
- Directed by: Tor Helmstein; Ian Kirby
- Voices of: Moon Bloodgood; Cam Clarke
- Narrated by: Moon Bloodgood
- Theme music composer: Brad Fiedel
- Opening theme: "The Terminator Theme"
- Ending theme: "Break the Silence" by Erik Thunberg and Simon Viklund
- Composer: Trond Viggo Melssen
- Country of origin: United States
- Original language: English
- No. of seasons: 1
- No. of episodes: 6

Production
- Executive producers: Joel B. Michaels; McG; Allen DeBevoise
- Producers: Derek Anderson; Victor Kubicek; Andy Shapiro; Cos Lazouras
- Running time: 12–14 (74 minutes)
- Production companies: Warner Premiere Digital; Wonderland Sound and Vision; The Halcyon Company; Machinima, Inc.

Original release
- Network: Machinima
- Release: May 18 – June 24, 2009

Terminator Salvation: The Machinima Series is an American animated military science-fiction action web series and is part of the Terminator franchise. The series premiered on Machinima on May 18, 2009 and concluded on June 24, 2009. Taking place between the events of Terminator 3: Rise of the Machines and Terminator Salvation, the series was created using real-time computer animation from the video game and serves as a prequel to the game.

It was released on DVD on November 3, 2009.

== Production ==
The web series is written by Andy Shapiro and co-directed by Tor Helmstein. Moon Bloodgood, who appeared in the 2009 film, provided her voice for the film's character Blair Williams in the series and the video game of the same name. Explained by McG, director of Terminator Salvation: "From a film maker's point of view, Machinima provides an incredibly dynamic way to explore live worlds and tell compelling new stories". The video game creator and Halcyon Games president Cos Lazouras said: "Re-purposing our game to produce the very first dramatic series in this medium is a fantastic innovation and will become the norm for game makers in the future". Diane Nelson, president of Warner Bros.: "After meeting with McG and Halcyon's creative teams we could easily see the power and potential of this type of content. The combination of McG and the Game maker's creative talent and the inherent essence of the man vs. machine concept made for a natural feature-length story".

== Premise ==
Set in 2016, years after Judgment Day, (Note: As depicted in Terminator 3: Rise of the Machines (2003)) the series follows Blair Williams, who is fighting the war against the machines in downtown Los Angeles, while tracking down the computer hacker Laz Howard and trying to persuade him to join sides with the resistance.

== Cast ==
- Moon Bloodgood as Blair Williams
- Cam Clarke as Laz Howard
- Jim Meskimen as Command

== Episodes ==
No.	Episode	Directed by	Written by	Original release date
1	Episode 1	Tor Helmstein & Ian Kirby	Andy Shapiro	May 18, 2009
Blair Williams starts out on a deadly mission to a decimated Los Angeles, a known hot zone after the nuclear destruction of Judgment Day. She searches for "The Ghost", who has been interfering with Resistance communications and rendering them defenseless against Skynet's lethal machines.
2	Episode 2	Tor Helmstein	Andy Shapiro	May 25, 2009
Blair takes Laz on the dangerous journey back to Command, as the deadly T-600 Terminators use all their resources to stop them.
3	Episode 3	Tor Helmstein	Andy Shapiro	June 3, 2009
Laz shares his secret to fighting the machines just before the T-600s attack again. Blair and Laz are on the brink of death in a grueling battle against the machines. Command now instructs Blair that she must retreat from the battle and leave Laz behind, which would mean his certain death, despite her misgivings.
4	Episode 4	Tor Helmstein	Andy Shapiro	June 10, 2009
Blair ultimately decides to take Laz back to base and defy Command. While searching for supplies for their journey, Laz and Blair are trapped in an abandoned office building by a machine. Blair jumps into an elevator shaft and is knocked unconscious.
5	Episode 5	Tor Helmstein	Andy Shapiro	June 18, 2009
Laz is alone to face the machines. Blair returns to base and tries to convince Command to retrieve him. Skynet attacks the base. Laz finds a group of survivalists but is soon attacked by a machine. Blair thinks all hope is lost when she hears Laz's name read on the radio along with the others presumed dead.
6	Episode 6	Tor Helmstein	Andy Shapiro	June 24, 2009
Blair finds Laz as the machines strike again. Laz rescues Blair from certain death. She thinks the key to fighting the Resistance is gone forever; however an unexpected discovery renews her commitment to the Resistance and fighting Skynet.
