= Terminator: The Sarah Connor Chronicles =

American science fiction TV series (2008–2009)

- Genre: Science fiction drama
- Created by: Josh Friedman
- Based on: Characters by James Cameron; Gale Anne Hurd
- Starring: Lena Headey; Thomas Dekker; Summer Glau; Brian Austin Green; Garret Dillahunt; Shirley Manson; Richard T. Jones; Leven Rambin; Stephanie Jacobsen
- Narrated by: Lena Headey
- Theme music composer: Brad Fiedel
- Opening theme: "The Terminator Theme"
- Composer: Bear McCreary
- Country of origin: United States
- Original language: English
- No. of seasons: 2
- No. of episodes: 31 (list of episodes)

Production
- Executive producers: Josh Friedman; Mario Kassar; Joel B. Michaels; James Middleton; Andrew G. Vajna; John Wirth; David Nutter (pilot)
- Producer: Jill Danton
- Production locations: Albuquerque, New Mexico (pilot); Los Angeles, California
- Running time: 41-52 minutes
- Production companies: Sarah Connor Pictures; Bartleby Company; C2 Pictures (season 1); The Halcyon Company (season 2); Warner Bros. Television

Original release
- Network: Fox
- Release: January 13, 2008 – April 10, 2009

Terminator: The Sarah Connor Chronicles (sometimes abbreviated as Terminator: TSCC or simply TSCC) is an American science fiction drama television series. It aired on Fox from January 13, 2008 to April 10, 2009, spanning 31 episodes across two seasons. It is a spin-off from the Terminator film series, disregarding the events of Terminator 3: Rise of the Machines and picking up shortly after Terminator 2: Judgment Day. The series revolves around the lives of Sarah Connor (portrayed by Lena Headey) and her son John (Thomas Dekker), who work to prevent the creation of Skynet, an artificially intelligent computer system that will eventually launch a nuclear war on humans.

The Sarah Connor Chronicles was created by writer and executive producer Josh Friedman, marking his television debut. Production companies included Warner Bros. Television and C2 Pictures, the latter replaced by The Halcyon Company in season two. The series was produced by C2 founders Mario Kassar and Andrew G. Vajna, who also produced Terminator 3. Other producers included C2 executive James Middleton and David Nutter, who directed the pilot episode. The show's soundtrack was composed by Bear McCreary.

The Sarah Connor Chronicles was greenlit in 2007 for a thirteen-episode season, which was reduced to nine episodes because of the Writers Guild of America strike. The series premiered mid-season and would go on to receive generally positive reviews, but it also saw low viewership ratings as it progressed through its second season. The Sarah Connor Chronicles was cancelled on May 18, 2009, despite a fan campaign urging Fox to renew it.

== Series overview ==
Season	Episodes	Originally released	
Season	Episodes	First released	Last released
1	9	January 13, 2008	March 3, 2008
2	22	September 8, 2008	April 10, 2009

=== Background ===
In the film Terminator 2: Judgment Day, Sarah Connor and her son John infiltrate the headquarters of Cyberdyne Systems to prevent the creation of Skynet, an artificially intelligent computer system. In the future, Skynet will launch a nuclear war on humans in an event known as Judgment Day, and John will later lead a human resistance against Skynet and its arsenal of Terminator machines.

In the present, young John is pursued by the T-1000, a shapeshifting Terminator sent by Skynet to kill him. The future John sent back a re-programmed T-800 to protect his younger self. Skynet was to be created by Miles Dyson, a Cyberdyne employee who, in the present, is convinced to help the Connors. He dies in an explosion destroying Cyberdyne and his research. This is followed by the destruction of the T-1000 and T-800, preventing the latter's technology from being reverse engineered to create Skynet, as in the original timeline. Because of these actions, the future is altered and Judgment Day is seemingly averted.

=== Season 1 ===
Despite the Connors' earlier effort, they merely delayed Skynet's creation. In 1999, four years after the events of Terminator 2, (Note: Terminator 2 is set in 1995, although the television series places the events of the film in 1997.) a T-888 known as "Cromartie" is sent from the future to kill John. Another Terminator, "Cameron", was re-programmed by the future John and sent back from 2027 (Note: The Terminator and Terminator 2 depict time travelers arriving from 2029, although the television series places those events in 2027.) to protect his younger self. Her exterior appearance is based on Allison Young, a resistance fighter and John's friend in the future, who was killed by Cameron prior to re-programming. Besides Cromartie, the Connors are also pursued by FBI Special Agent James Ellison, who initially believes Sarah is an insane criminal (based on the events of Terminator 2). Sarah is romantically involved with a paramedic named Charley Dixon, but ends her relationship with him to go on the run again. She and John relocate from Nebraska to New Mexico, where Cameron finds them. John soon becomes frustrated with their life of running, so Sarah sets out to stop Skynet again and prevent Judgment Day, now expected to occur in 2011.

During the pilot episode, Cameron and the Connors make a temporal leap to Los Angeles 2007, as Skynet begins taking shape. Cromartie suffers extensive damage while trying to kill them, but begins repairing his endoskeleton and artificial flesh, and continues his search for John in 2007. The Connors find Skynet has also sent other Terminators back in time to support its own creation, and the resistance has sent back fighters to interfere. Sarah also deals with the fear of pending cancer.

The Connors and Cameron seek out an intuitive chess computer called "the Turk" (named after the 18th-century hoax), a suspected precursor to Skynet. They also forge an alliance with John's uncle Derek Reese, a resistance fighter. Derek is the brother of John's father, Kyle Reese. The Turk is created by Andy Goode, a former assistant to Dyson. Derek kills Andy, but someone else has already taken the computer.

=== Season 2 ===
Despite losing sight of the Turk, the Connors continue their efforts to prevent the rise of Skynet. A dying resistance fighter arrives from the future and provides the Connors a list of people relevant to their mission, many of them requiring protection from Terminators. Sarah later learns of a company, the Kaliba Group, which has an apparent connection to Skynet.

The Turk is purchased by Catherine Weaver, CEO of ZeiraCorp. Unknown to others, Weaver is a shapeshifting T-1001. She is posing as the real Weaver, who died sometime prior and left behind a young daughter, Savannah, now raised by the doppelganger. The T-1001/Weaver commissions work on an AI project using the Turk. She also convinces Ellison to work for her, showing him evidence of Terminators in the present and requesting that he find one so they can study it. Cromartie is later deactivated by the Connors, but unknown to them, his body is taken by Ellison and brought to Weaver. She has it connected to her AI project, known as John Henry, giving him a physical but stationary presence at ZeiraCorp. His knowledge grows rapidly after Weaver connects him to the Internet, but he is later hacked by a similar AI originating from Dyson's work on Skynet. John Henry recovers and wishes to learn more about his counterpart.

Meanwhile, Jesse Flores and Riley Dawson have arrived from an altered future where John, as resistance leader, only communicates through Cameron, having become increasingly reliant on her. Jesse, a resistance fighter, recruited Riley in a mission to stop Cameron's influence on young John, by having Riley become his girlfriend. Secretly, Jesse intends for Cameron to view Riley as a threat and thus kill her, making John distrustful of machines. However, Riley deduces the full extent of the plan, and Jesse kills her during an argument; John soon learns of this. Derek, Jesse's love interest, confronts her, although her fate is left ambiguous. Derek is later killed by a T-888 while the Connors are rescuing Savannah from the machine.

In the season-one finale, Cameron is damaged in a vehicle explosion which has negative effects on her programming throughout the second season, occasionally causing her to glitch and engage in unexpected behavior. As the season concludes, the Connors learn of John Henry's existence and believe him to be Skynet. They meet with Weaver, who reveals herself as a Terminator. She says they actually share a common enemy in Skynet, which John is destined to fight with the help of John Henry. Meanwhile, Cameron has already been sent by the Connors to kill John Henry. Instead, however, she allows him to take her CPU, giving him mobility. He then travels to the post-Judgment Day future, using one of Weaver's time machines. John – wishing to retrieve Cameron's CPU and reactivate her – time travels with Weaver to locate John Henry, while Sarah and Ellison stay behind. In the future, John meets alternate versions of Derek, Kyle, and Allison who do not know him. He realizes the future has been altered by his absence in the past, learning he has not led the resistance in this new timeline.

== Cast and characters ==
=== Main ===
- Lena Headey as Sarah Connor:
  Sarah Connor is a major character in the Terminator series. She is the mother of John Connor, who will one day become the leader of the human resistance. The authorities, however, see her as a deranged fugitive.
- Thomas Dekker as John Connor:
  John Connor is Sarah's son and the future leader of the human resistance. He is 15 years old at the beginning of the show, turning 16 in the season one finale, and 17 throughout season two. As the series progresses, John struggles with his feelings for Cameron, who is a Terminator.
  - John De Vito played as the young John Connor in two episodes "Queen's Gambit" and "To the Lighthouse".
- Summer Glau as Cameron / Allison Young:
  Cameron is a Terminator whom John Connor sent back from 2027 to protect his earlier self. Her model and exact capabilities are not known, but she can mimic human mannerisms better than any previous Terminator and can also consume small amounts of food, a first for Terminators. Later in the series it is revealed that Cameron assumed the identity of a resistance fighter, Allison Young, before being reprogrammed.
- Richard T. Jones as James Ellison:
  James Ellison is an FBI Special Agent pursuing Sarah Connor. At first puzzled by what he initially thinks is Sarah's outlandish story, he later collects irrefutable evidence of the existence of Terminators (including the body of Cromartie) and gradually realizes the truth. In the second season, Ellison pursues employment with ZeiraCorp, allying himself with Catherine Weaver (whom he does not know is a Terminator until the series finale).
- Brian Austin Green as Derek Reese:
  Derek Reese is a Resistance fighter sent to the past by the future John Connor. He is the older brother of Kyle Reese (John Connor's father) and paternal uncle of John. He knows Cameron in the future, but still does not trust her. He is recurring in the first season but becomes a regular in the second season. Derek has a romantic relationship with Jesse Flores, a resistance fighter who arrives from the future. He is killed by a Terminator while attempting to save Savannah Weaver. Another Derek from an alternate timeline is introduced in the series finale.
- Leven Rambin as Riley Dawson (season 2):
  Riley Dawson is John's new love interest that he meets at school, much to the consternation of Sarah. John does not reveal the story of his life to her, but as they get closer, he realizes he is endangering her life. Unknown to John, a resistance fighter, Jesse, has brought Riley back from the future to prevent John from getting too close to Cameron, and to get close to John. She appears to develop genuine romantic feelings for John. Jesse later kills Riley after a struggle.
- Garret Dillahunt as Cromartie / John Henry:
  Cromartie is a T-888 sent back in time to kill John Connor in the pilot episode, in which he was portrayed by Owain Yeoman. He takes damage to his biological covering, revealing his metal endoskeleton. In the episode "The Turk", he finds a new biological covering in the shape of fictional actor George Laszlo, then continues his search for John. After chasing John and Riley into Mexico, Cromartie's chip is destroyed and John buries his body in the desert. When John returns later to destroy Cromartie's body, it has been moved. Ellison has recovered the body for Catherine Weaver, who connects Cromartie's body to the Babylon A.I. named John Henry. Dillahunt was a recurring character in the first season, but becomes a regular character in the last season, portraying Laszlo, Cromartie and John Henry.
- Shirley Manson as Catherine Weaver (season 2):
  Catherine Weaver is a shape-shifting Terminator disguised as the CEO of a high-tech corporation called ZeiraCorp. She is a model T-1001 made of a liquid metal that is capable of shapeshifting, like the T-1000 in Terminator 2: Judgment Day. She is focused on developing artificial intelligence using The Turk, the intuitive computer at first believed to be a precursor to Skynet (but later shown to be a separate entity). She targets other Terminators to reverse-engineer Skynet technology in the present, and to prepare for the future war. She plans on using this research to fight Skynet. Despite the revelation that Weaver is an enemy of Skynet, it is still unknown where her allegiance lies (though it is heavily hinted she supports a peaceful alliance with humans, evidenced by teaching John Henry human-like values). Weaver hints at her motives in the episode "Born to Run" when she asks Cameron, "Will you join us?" through messenger James Ellison. During the episode "Today Is the Day Part 2" Cameron explains to Jesse Flores that John Connor asked the same question of the T-1001 in an attempt to forge an alliance against Skynet.

=== Supporting ===
- Dean Winters as Charley Dixon:
  Charley Dixon, a paramedic, is Sarah's fiancé until she leaves him in the pilot episode and travels eight years forward in time. Although he marries another woman in the interim, during subsequent episodes he builds a friendship with the Connors and renders medical assistance when needed. When his wife is killed in the second season episode "The Mousetrap", he is not seen again until the episode "To The Lighthouse", which reveals that he now lives in a lighthouse, being a safe house that Sarah set up for him, which he has booby trapped and alarmed to protect against further attacks. When the house is invaded by human assassins acting for the apparent proto-Skynet, Charley is killed enabling John Connor to escape.
- Stephanie Jacobsen as Jesse Flores:
  Jesse is an Australian resistance sailor and Derek Reese's love interest in 2027. She travels 20 years into the past, but it is later learned that she comes from an alternate future, different to the one known by Derek in 2007. In Jesse's future timeline, John has withdrawn from humans and speaks only with Cameron. Jesse arrived in 2007 on a self-imposed mission to find and stop Cameron from adversely influencing young John, by recruiting Riley Dawson in the future and bringing her back to frame Cameron for her murder. It is unclear whether this mission is self-appointed, but comments by her and the fact she was able to access the time travel machinery with Riley suggests others in the Resistance leadership group may share her concerns about Cameron's influence on John. In Jesse's timeline, she was the executive officer aboard the upgraded nuclear submarine USS Jimmy Carter, captained by a reprogrammed Terminator named Queeg. They sail with a crew to Australia to deliver supplies, although Queeg diverts the submarine to pick up a package and return it to John Connor. Suspicious, the crew decide to open the package, accidentally unleashing the T-1001, whom John hoped to recruit in the battle against Skynet. Jesse grows suspicious of Queeg's actions and terminates him, then evacuates the submarine and destroys it in an attempt to kill the T-1001. She had been pregnant at the time with Derek's baby, and she later learns from Cameron that she miscarried due to the pressure from leaving the submarine. In 2007, Cameron tells Derek about the miscarriage and he says he never had any children. John later figures out that Jesse killed Riley and informs Derek, but orders her life to be spared. Derek confronts Jesse, telling her that they are from two different futures and that he does not know who she is. He tells her, "John Connor wanted to let you go. I'm not John Connor." He pulls his gun on her, and she takes off running as he pulls the trigger. Whether or not Derek actually kills her is left ambiguous; when asked by John about the confrontation, Derek merely says, "John Connor let her go."

== Production ==
=== Conception ===
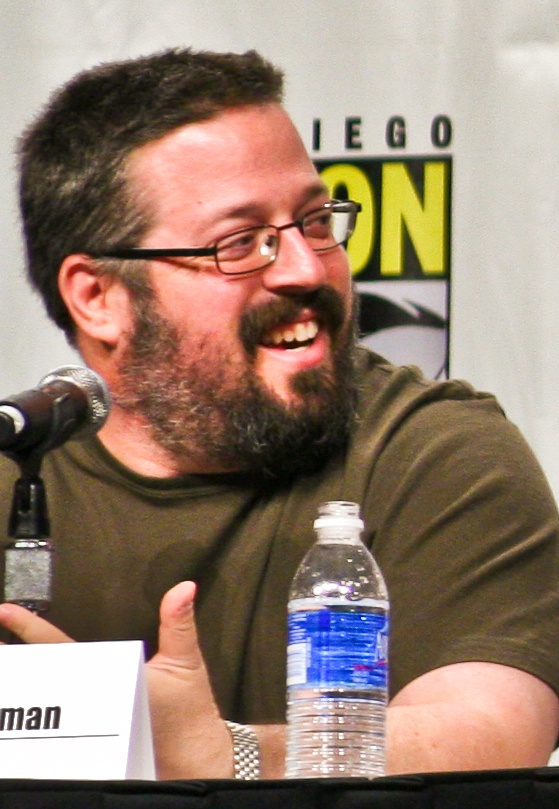
The series was created by Josh Friedman, who served as one of its writers and executive producers.

On November 9, 2005, it was reported that a television series based on the Terminator franchise was being produced by C2 Pictures, which produced the 2003 film Terminator 3: Rise of the Machines. The show would be created in association with Warner Bros. Television, while the Fox Broadcasting Company committed to the pilot episode. Josh Friedman was set to write the pilot and to serve as an executive producer for the series, marking his television debut.

Other executive producers included C2 founders Andy Vajna and Mario Kassar, and C2's vice president of development James Middleton. Unlike the Terminator films, Friedman commented that the show would contain fewer action sequences due to the smaller budget of television in contrast to feature films. He also felt that frequent chases, as depicted in the films, would become repetitive in a television adaptation. The series was initially titled The Sarah Connor Chronicles. "Terminator" would later be added to the title to capitalize on its name recognition among general viewers. There had been debate, during pre-production, about whether to include it in the title, with Friedman in favor.

Sarah Connor is a major character in the 1984 film The Terminator and its 1991 sequel Terminator 2: Judgment Day. An early version of Terminator 3 also would have featured her, but this did not come to fruition, with Sarah instead dying of leukemia prior to the film's events. Middleton devised the idea for a Terminator television series following the release of the third film: "After T3 came out, I started to miss Sarah. I kept thinking, How could we bring her back?" Friedman developed The Sarah Connor Chronicles as an alternate sequel to Terminator 2, ignoring the events of the third film. Discussing the show, he said, "I almost think of this as T3. To me it takes the place of T3. But also I think that sort of in the spirit of Terminator, it's an alternate timeline. I know a lot of people get very worked up about the continuity and the canon and all that stuff."

Friedman initially considered Kyle Reese as a regular character in the present, having traveled from the future in a way that would not disrupt the continuity of the first two films: "I had a whole way it worked in my head and the more I tried to explain it to people, the crazier it sounded." Middleton talked him out of this idea, finding it confusing. Friedman still felt it was important for the series to have a connection with Kyle, resulting in the creation of a brother character named Derek. Kyle himself would ultimately make appearances as well, though not as a time traveler.

Terminator franchise creator James Cameron, director and writer of the first two films, was not involved with the television series. Fox greenlit production in August 2006, after Warner Bros. hired David Nutter to direct the pilot episode. He had previously directed the pilot for Cameron's Dark Angel in 2000. Nutter described The Sarah Connor Chronicles as "a huge project that's going to take an extensive amount of preparation and pre-production." Accordingly, he chose not to direct any other pilots for the rest of the television season, focusing solely on the Terminator project in order to protect "the integrity of what Cameron created."

Early on, Friedman had a rough idea of where the series could go over the course of four seasons. At the time, he viewed Judgment Day as an inevitable event despite the Connors' efforts, with the final season to be set during the future war. The eventual series focused extensively on exploring religious and humanistic themes and ideas.

=== Casting ===
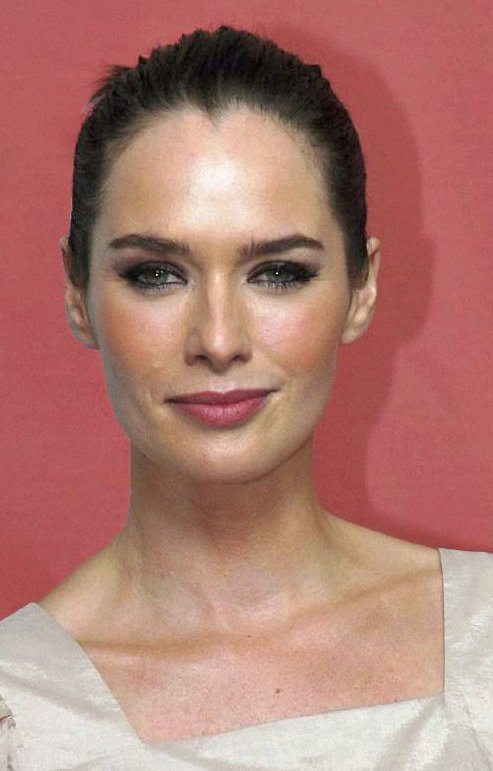
Lena Headey portrayed Sarah Connor, taking over the role that originated in the films with Linda Hamilton.

Friedman saw over 300 actresses for the role of Sarah Connor and described the actress he was looking for as someone "who embodied that spirit and who was believable in that role and not just some glammed up, Hollywood, actressy thing". After a friend recommended English actress Lena Headey for the role, Friedman watched her audition tape, and thought she was "a tough, tough woman".

Headey was cast in November 2006. Having seen The Terminator when she was a teenager, which "scared the hell out of" her, Headey was aware of the iconic status of the character and in regards to Linda Hamilton's portrayal of the role in the film series, she remarked, "Linda Hamilton will always be the original Sarah Connor and it's a very strong print that she's left, but hopefully people will embrace what I bring to Sarah and see it with fresh eyes". When asked about her approach to the role, Headey said

I'm playing a mother who is a single parent, bringing up a teenage son, who also happens to save the world—as a byline to her life. And the way I would play that is someone who's passionate and scared and angry and a mother, all these things. So I approach that just trying to be honest within the boundaries of her.

However, the choice to cast Headey was criticized by some fans and critics arguing that she bore no resemblance to the athletic woman established by Hamilton, who transformed her body into that of a muscled warrior for Terminator 2: Judgment Day. The controversy was covered by multiple news outlets.

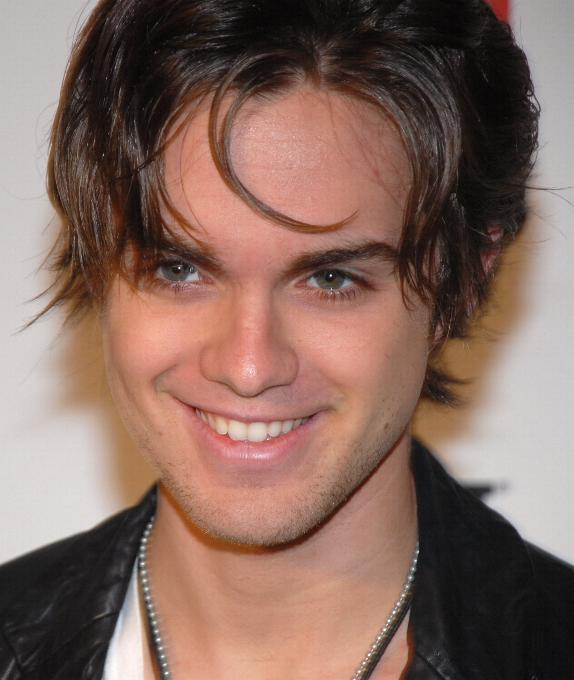
Thomas Dekker was cast as John Connor, becoming the third major actor in the franchise to play the role.

Thomas Dekker, a fan of the Terminator films, was cast as John Connor a month after Headey secured the role of Sarah. Dekker was hesitant about the idea of a Terminator television series, but accepted the role after reading the script and discussing the series with Friedman. John was portrayed by Edward Furlong in Terminator 2, and Dekker described his own portrayal as a continuation of Furlong's, while adding that the character is "in a darker, more mature place now". Dekker chose to initially portray John as weak and then gradually build him up into a stronger character, progressively transforming him into a believable future savior of humanity. He acknowledged criticism among some fans who took issue with his approach: "I knew it would frustrate some people in the first season with the performance I did."

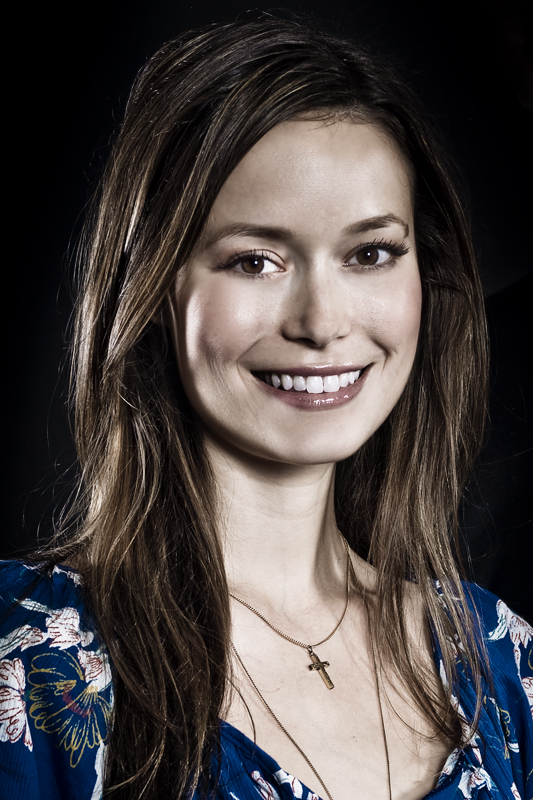
Summer Glau portrayed the new Terminator character known as Cameron.

Summer Glau had not seen the Terminator films prior to being cast as Cameron, a new character to the franchise whose name is a homage to James Cameron. Friedman had previously wanted to cast Glau in a pilot he wrote several years prior, but she was already committed to the 2005 film Serenity. Glau almost did not audition for the role of Cameron because of her preconceptions of the character and she felt that she did not have "that Terminator look". On playing Cameron, Glau said she was "intimidated" by the role because it was a challenge for her to balance the human and robot characteristics. Glau's involvement in the series was initially kept concealed from the public, until Headey announced who she would be playing in March 2007. Friedman had hoped to keep her role as a Terminator a surprise for the series premiere.

Richard T. Jones, who portrays James Ellison, was allowed to improvise a few lines to provide "a little bit of comic relief" to the show. He described his character as a "man of faith", and acknowledged that he is the one main character who initially does not believe in Sarah's story about the future apocalypse: "It's funny, because when I go about [playing] the character I try to put everything behind me and say, 'OK, I'm the one who doesn't know anything, but don't seem totally stupid. You're just the guy who hasn't caught up yet.'" He likened the role to that of Tommy Lee Jones' character in the 1993 film The Fugitive.

Garret Dillahunt re-watched the first two Terminator films to prepare for his role as Cromartie. He enjoyed playing the character, more so than he expected: "I thought it would be very finite, the things I could do. But then you realize how – not that anyone loves him – but you love the machines [and] how you can't part with them. It's weird. [...] I am enjoying that part of finding the way he has no hesitation. He is socially unskilled; he says 'hello' a little too hard, smiles a little too big."

Brian Austin Green auditioned as Derek Reese and quickly got the role, although fans were skeptical of his casting. Green was primarily known for his role in Beverly Hills, 90210, a 1990s teen drama series, prompting uncertainty about whether he was miscast in The Sarah Connor Chronicles. Friedman's fellow writers were also unsure about Green, until they saw his audition tape. Green himself was initially nervous about whether audiences would accept him in the role. He and Dillahunt would return for the second season, both promoted from guest stars to regulars.

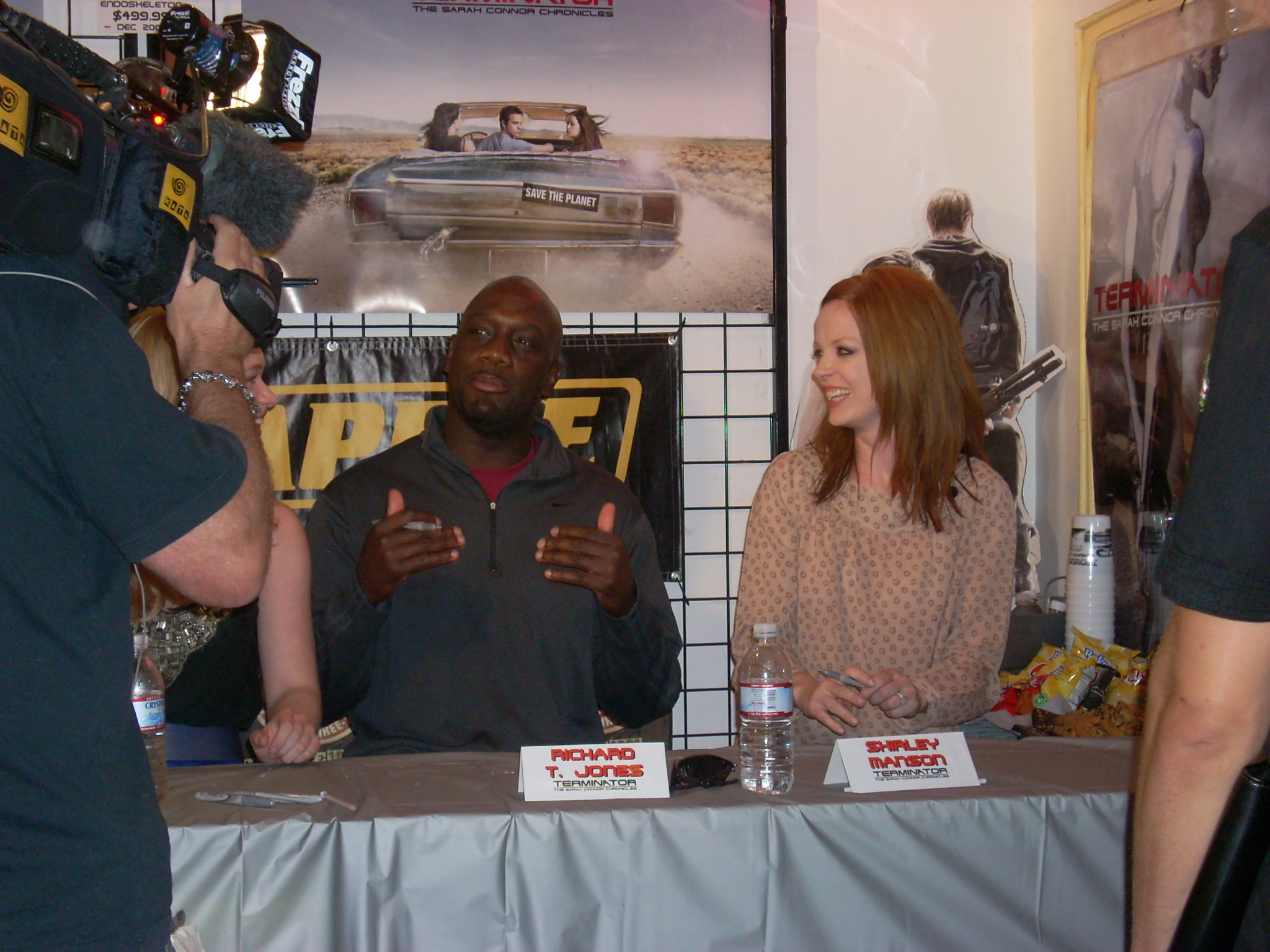
Richard T. Jones and Shirley Manson during a promotional event, September 2008

Shirley Manson, lead singer in the band Garbage, joined the second season as the T-1001 known as Catherine Weaver. The role marked Manson's acting debut. She was friends with Friedman's wife, and he had been interested in casting Manson. A Terminator fan, she agreed to audition without hesitation. She initially knew little about the character, as the writers themselves had yet to determine her full storyline. Manson gradually learned more about Weaver and her intentions as filming progressed, and would later be surprised by how big of a role her character had in the show. She had significant screentime with Jones and Dillahunt, who both offered acting tips and support.

Leven Rambin and Stephanie Jacobsen also joined the series for season two, portraying Riley Dawson and Jesse Flores respectively. Riley was named after Fox president Kevin Reiley, and was added after he suggested the addition of a girlfriend for John. Unlike other characters, Riley would serve as someone to whom John could express his deepest emotions.

Arnold Schwarzenegger had portrayed the original Terminator character in the first three films, before becoming governor of California in 2003. Asked about Schwarzenegger making an appearance on the show, Middleton said in 2007, "We've talked a lot about it. But the reality is that as governor, he's incredibly busy. As a star, he's incredibly expensive. We don't know." He ultimately did not appear on the show. Friedman said in 2008 that he was opposed to the film actors appearing in the series, wanting the latter to stand out on its own. He also wanted to avoid a mix of returning actors and recast characters.

=== Seasons ===
Terminator: The Sarah Connor Chronicles was among seven new shows picked up by Fox on May 13, 2007, for its 2007-08 television season. The series received an order for 13 episodes. However, production was affected by the Writers Guild of America strike, which lasted from November 2007 to February 2008. Seven episodes had been fully shot before the start of the strike, and two others were filmed during it. The four remaining episodes went un-filmed as they lacked finished scripts, a result of the strike.

Although Friedman's contract allowed him to be present for production, he chose not to take advantage of this out of respect for unemployed writers. Instead, Middleton was left to oversee production during the strike, while staying in contact with Friedman. The series premiered as the strike was still underway, and Friedman used his spare time to read online comments, gaining insight for future episodes. He felt that the first season was overly ambitious in trying to tell too many stories during each episode, with excess footage being removed as a result. Much of the cut material related to John and Cameron's time in high school, deemed unimportant compared with scenes involving Sarah. During the first season, episodes had a small budget of $2.6 million each. Friedman said producing the series on such a budget was difficult, but that it also occasionally worked in the show's favor as it "left us doing things that were more dramatic and emotional and conceptual, sometimes".

Some episodes were aired out of production order so the season could end on a cliffhanger. The season finale, "What He Beheld", includes a scene in which Cromartie massacres numerous FBI agents sent to apprehend him from a motel room. The scene is shot from the bottom of a swimming pool, as slain agents are continually tossed in by Cromartie, who is off-screen during this time. Middleton denied that the scene was shot this way as a cost-saving measure. Friedman recalled pitching the idea in the writers' room: "I said 'I want to do it all from the bottom of a swimming pool.' And everyone laughed at me. Not in a 'you're an idiot' way, but as if I was joking." He was inspired by the series Rescue Me, saying "whenever they show a fire, that fire has a point of view. It has its own story – whether it's a character story or a filmmaking story or a piece of music." For weeks, Dillahunt had been excited to film the massacre, until learning how it would be shot: "I was a little disappointed, but it turned out great, so I can't complain. But I was thinking, 'What? I don't mess up anybody!?'"

A second season of 13 episodes was greenlit in April 2008, and was extended to a full order that October, making a total of 22 episodes for the season. It was written to be less serialized and ambitious than the first season, and includes fewer school scenes than before. The second season's early episodes incorporated the un-filmed storylines from season one. The series would not be renewed for a third season.

=== Filming locations ===
The pilot episode was filmed primarily in Albuquerque, New Mexico. The principal photography started on January 24, 2007 and took approximately one month to complete. Subsequent episodes in the series were filmed in Los Angeles. A primary filming location was the backlot of Warner Brothers Studios in Burbank, California, on a set previously used by Gilmore Girls to depict the fictional town Stars Hollow.

=== Effects ===
Practical effects for the Terminators were provided by special makeup artist Robert Green Hall. The show's visual effects, including computer-generated images (CGI) of the Terminator endoskeletons, were handled by Zoic Studios. The company provided more than 400 effects shots for the pilot episode, and between 25 and 100 shots for each subsequent episode. The effects were created by various teams at Zoic, each one focusing on different aspects such as 3D, compositing, and wire removal. Because of the show's quick production schedule and limited budget, the effects crew looked to the first Terminator film as a model; it was produced on a low budget of $6 million.

For legal reasons involving franchise rights, the show could not re-use the T-800 endoskeleton featured in the films. Instead, the show's creators and its visual effects supervisor, Jim Lima, worked to design a new endoskeleton model that would become the T-888. Lima said about the name: "I was looking at it evolutionary wise that it started out as a T-800 and then in T3 there was a T-850. It's not a TX or a T-1000; it's still a T-800 model so it made sense to give it a tag that made sense in the 800 series. But it also sounds like a hot rod and there is something cool about the triple eights." Lima had about four months to design the new Terminator before the pilot started filming. Hall built the practical endoskeleton over the course of three weeks.

Entity FX replaced Zoic for season two, while Lima remained with the series. Entity's visual effects work included post-apocalyptic scenes and further CGI of the Terminators. For the T-1001's shapeshifting abilities, the Entity team referred to the T-1000 in Terminator 2. The effects for the T-1001 were created through CGI, combined with a digital scan of Manson's face and body.

=== Music ===
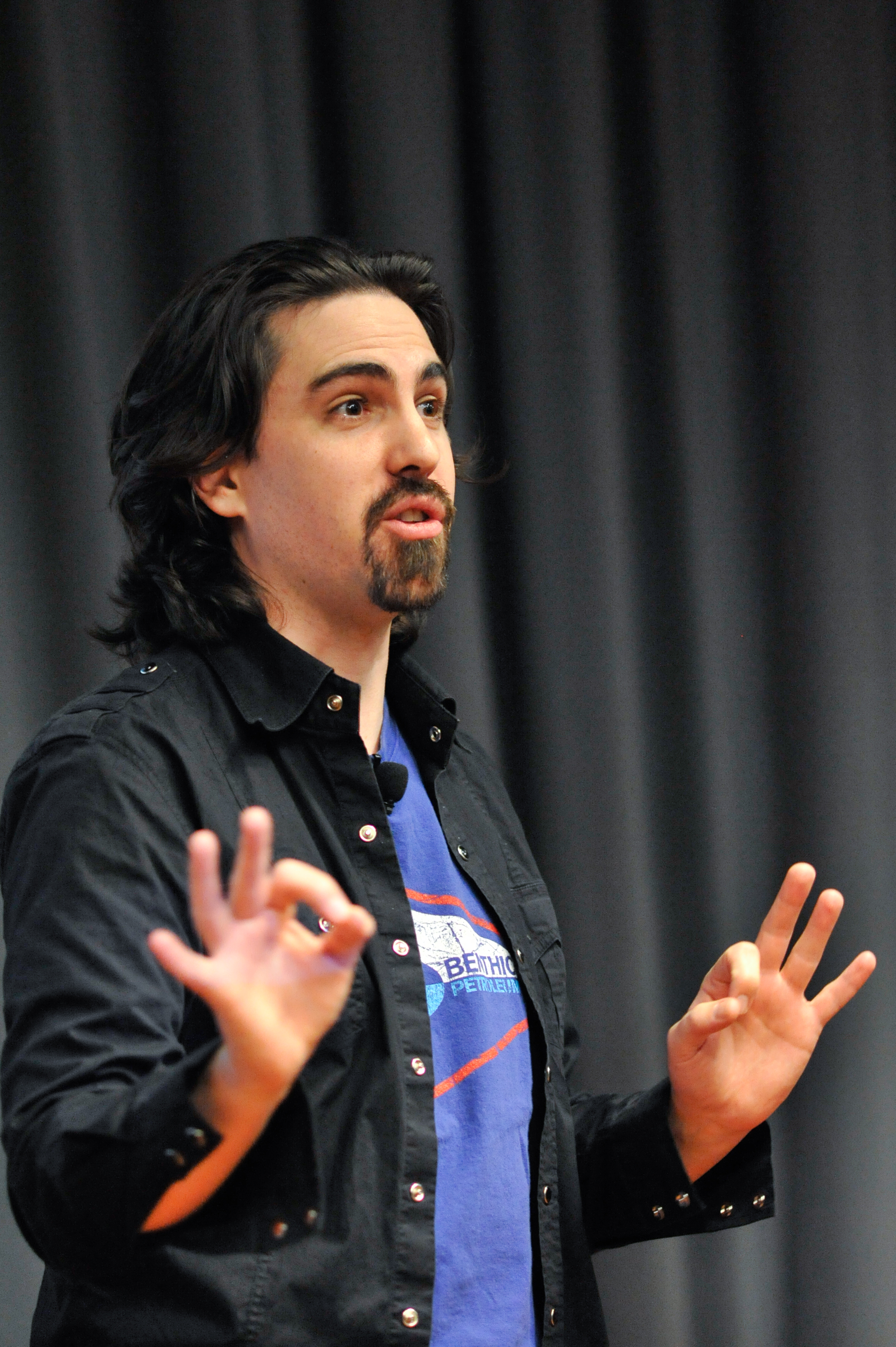
Bear McCreary composed the show's music.

Terminator: The Sarah Connor Chronicles features incidental music composed by Bear McCreary. For financial reasons, the main theme of the Terminator film series, originally composed by Brad Fiedel, is featured only briefly in the TV series—mainly during the title sequence. McCreary has stated that his score is inspired by the tone of Fiedel's score in the first two Terminator films and since the television series is a direct sequel to Terminator 2: Judgment Day, he felt that the tone of the music should be consistent with that of the film as much as possible. He began working on the score by recording metallic sounds, using "oil cans, whale drums, chains, anvils, brake drums, garbage cans, thundersheets ... [etc.]", after which he edited the samples and created his own custom library of metallic drums. For every episode thereafter, live metal percussion elements were recorded on top of the electronics. While Fiedel's scores were performed using synthesizers, McCreary chose to use an ensemble of electric string instruments instead.

A musical theme was created for each of the principal characters. The theme for Sarah Connor is the most frequently used theme in addition to being the longest and the most developed theme in the series. There are two main sections to Sarah's theme with one presenting her "bad-ass, stoic warrior" side and the other as "a loving mother". John's theme was originally composed for a specific scene in the pilot episode and performed with a solo clarinet to convey his loneliness and awkwardness. McCreary stated that the "musical ambiguity in the melody" is used to show John's transformation in the series. Although themes were also written for other characters such as Derek Reese, James Ellison and the "evil terminator[s]", no themes were written for Cameron during the first season because McCreary felt that "her character was defined by her relationship with John, Sarah and the others around her" so Sarah's or John's theme was used in most of her scenes.

The series mainly features McCreary's original score. Songs and instrumental music from other sources are used sparingly. "The Man Comes Around" by Johnny Cash was used in the first-season finale, and a cover of "Samson and Delilah" by Shirley Manson was used in the second-season premiere. Both songs were background music for action sequences in their respective episodes. For the episode "Mr. Ferguson Is Ill Today", McCreary created a version of the song "La Llorona". The episode "Today Is the Day, Part 2" (Note: Also known as "The Last Voyage of the Jimmy Carter".) features "New Messiah", a song by Dead Heart Bloom. Another episode, "Adam Raised a Cain", features a moody cover of "Donald Where's Your Troosers? performed by Garret Dillahunt and Mackenzie Brooke Smith at the closing. The song was originally written and recorded by Andy Stewart. The record label La-La Land Records released the original television soundtrack for Terminator: The Sarah Connor Chronicles on December 23, 2008.

== Marketing ==
Prior to its broadcast, Fox undertook a large marketing effort to promote the show, which was described by Joe Earley, Fox Executive Vice President of Marketing and Communications, as the "biggest campaign for a new mid-season show in years." The advertising campaign began months prior to the premiere to make sure that the show would attract existing and new Terminator fans. After 24 was postponed to the 2008-09 TV season, more time was devoted to the show by Fox's marketing team and more on-air promotional spots were available for the show that would otherwise have gone to 24.

Fox began their advertising campaign for Terminator: The Sarah Connor Chronicles on September 27, 2007, with a brief teaser which ran during primetime programs, consisting of an image of two red dots that lasted for a few seconds on screen before disappearing. The two red dots were revealed to be the eyes of the Terminators from the show in the second phase of the advertising campaign, which began two weeks later. The final phase of the campaign commenced in November 2007 with more broadcast information being added to the advertisements.

In addition to on-air teasers, Fox heavily promoted the show during the World Series by broadcasting a 45-second preview on October 27, 2007. Other forms of advertisements used included: mobile tours on "Terminator" buses sponsored by Verizon Wireless; an interactive cell phone game based on the series offered by Verizon's V CAST, which rewarded the players with ring tones, wallpapers and behind-the-scenes footage; cable tie-ins; online outreach via the official website and wiki; online sneak peeks; and a poster design contest run by Fox. Advance screenings of the pilot episode were also held at the 2007 Comic-Con International convention and at Golden Apple Comics in Los Angeles on January 4, 2008.

In Super Bowl XLII, a Terminator was featured in a brief advertisement fighting Cleatus the Fox Sports Robot.

Billboard advertisements, which were described by Variety to have "blanketed New York and L.A.", contained images of Summer Glau's Terminator in a "Lady Godiva-esque pose" used to target the young-male demographic, while the key art emphasized on Sarah Connor being at the core of the show to attract the "mom demo". Fox originally planned for more outdoor marketing in other cities but the marketing budget was reduced because of the 2007–08 Writers Guild of America strike.

A promotional partnership with automobile manufacturer Dodge began in the show's second season and featured placement of Dodge products in several episodes, Dodge's exclusive sponsorship of the extended, 52-minute episode "Goodbye to All That," and a four-week vehicle giveaway entitled "The Never Back Down Challenge."

== Release ==
=== Broadcast ===
Originally scheduled to premiere on Monday, January 14, 2008, the show's debut was rescheduled to commence a day earlier, after Fox reorganized their broadcast timetable due to the writers' strike. Fox originally planned to premiere Terminator: The Sarah Connor Chronicles in the Monday 8:00 p.m. ET timeslot as a lead-in program for 24. However, the latter show's new season was delayed because of the strike, resulting in the changes. Following the Sunday premiere, subsequent episodes of The Sarah Connor Chronicles aired on Monday at 9:00 p.m. ET timeslot with Prison Break as its lead-in program.

The second season premiered on September 8, 2008, in the Monday 8:00 p.m. ET timeslot. Due to schedule changes from Fox, the show had a two-month break starting in December 2008. Benjamin Svetkey of Entertainment Weekly was critical of the hiatus: "Just figuring out when new episodes would be on the air has been a time-travel paradox so perplexing it would drive John Connor crazy. At a certain point, I stopped trying." He further added that the show's "on-again-off-again scheduling has made it all but impossible to build any traction with its increasingly complex plotlines." Green said that "for the people that don't watch it every week, there's no possible way they could follow it. Josh doesn't want to dumb the show down for the people that don't follow it, just so they can tune in whenever they want and sort of pick up wherever we are in the story."

The season resumed on February 13, 2009, airing at 8:00 p.m. ET. on Fridays, which is generally seen as a death slot for television. Glau said about the change: "I was not happy at first when I heard that we were moving. But, you know, we've been fighting for our audience on Mondays so I'm hoping this is going to be a positive thing. It's always good when they're trying to work with you and help you."

The Syfy channel later acquired the rerun rights and began airing the series on April 7, 2011.

=== Home media ===
The first season was released on August 11, 2008 in the United Kingdom, on August 13, 2008 in Australia, and on August 19, 2008 in North America. The Region 1 DVD set contains all nine episodes aired from the first season, commentary on select episodes, audition tapes for select actors, video of Summer Glau practicing for her ballet scenes, making of features, and deleted scenes for certain episodes. The Region 2 and 4 versions have all nine episodes but have excluded all the special features apart from the deleted scenes. The season was also released on Blu-ray. The three-disc sets released in North America and Europe contain the same bonus features offered by the Region 1 DVD set. On the Blu-ray disc set, each episode is encoded in 1080p, VC-1 compression with a 1.78:1 aspect ratio and is presented with a Dolby Digital 5.1 audio track.

The second season was released on September 22, 2009 in North America, and on November 16, 2009 in the United Kingdom on DVD and Blu-ray.

In Ireland the second season was released along with a boxset containing the first and second seasons of the show on November 16, 2009. The North American release date was originally planned to "coincide with the home video release of the summer blockbuster Terminator Salvation", but the release of Terminator Salvation was later postponed to December 1, 2009. In New Zealand the second season DVD set was released on November 11, 2009 as was a boxed set containing both seasons.

== Cancellation ==
The series saw low viewership ratings as it progressed, and Fox announced on May 18, 2009 that it would not be renewed for a third season. The show's cost, as well as the ratings, were cited for its cancellation. Fox president Kevin Reilly said, "We make no apologies for that show – we did a huge launch with that show. We tried. It was time to move on." Fox was expected to cancel the series ahead of the official announcement, prompting a fan campaign to save the show. Josh Levs of CNN also wrote an online commentary urging Fox to renew it. The series also topped polls asking viewers which shows they would save from cancellation.

Fox is a broadcast network, and Friedman suggested it was unlikely that the show would be picked up by a cable network, saying shortly before the cancellation: "It's not an expensive show. It's very average in terms of its costs, but it's more expensive than all cable shows. There are limited places for a show like this, I think." Middleton had hoped to continue the series as a direct-to-DVD film, although this did not pan out. By 2013, crowdfunding had been used to revive previously canceled television shows, although Friedman dismissed this approach for The Sarah Connor Chronicles. The Terminator franchise rights had been sold to new owners who sought to pursue high-budget Terminator films rather than continue the television series. Friedman stated, "I know it's harsh but I can't imagine a scenario where there will ever be more TSCC in any form. We have what we have."

In 2011, IGN included the series among a list of ten shows deserving of another season, and later ranked it among 12 canceled shows worthy of a revival. In 2015, CinemaBlend included it among the "12 Shows Fox Should Be Embarrassed About Canceling".

Thomas Dekker, in a fan livestream in 2017 hosted on the official T:SCC Facebook page, claimed that the main cast of the show were in year-long talks to close out the whole show. This would have featured four two-hour-long episodes in a miniseries as a de facto season 3. However, due to the Terminator license being expensive, this did not occur. He stated that he and his other co-stars would be willing to come back to finish the show.

=== Unproduced storyline ===
Friedman has declined to reveal how the storyline would have proceeded and asked his fellow writers to follow suit, instead letting fans decide the outcome for themselves using their imagination. A few months after the cancellation, Dekker said the third season would have shown the rise of John Connor in the alternate future timeline depicted at the end of season two. John would develop a romantic attraction to Allison Young, conflicting with his feelings for Cameron. He would also take an interest in Savannah Weaver, now an adult and a human resistance fighter.

The third season would primarily focus on John's time during the future war, while Sarah's present-day storyline would also continue, tying in with the future plot. Dekker hinted that the season would have also featured an older version of Sarah who survived Judgment Day. Danny Dyson, the son of original Skynet inventor Miles Dyson, also would have been a major character. In addition, the season would have featured the return of Derek, Jesse, and Riley. Discussing a potential third season before the cancellation, Green said, "It's not completely clear yet but what we're sort of getting, as far as Weaver goes, is that Weaver could end up being somebody who was sent back by John Connor in the future and John Henry was created as an alternate to Skynet." In 2018, Friedman further explained that Weaver came from a moderate faction of Skynet, seeking alternative solutions to the future war. However, the dissenting group's proposals, such as a human alliance, eventually led to infighting.

== Response ==
=== Ratings ===
Seasonal rankings (based on a weighted average total viewers per episode) for Terminator: The Sarah Connor Chronicles in the United States:

Viewership and ratings per season of Terminator: The Sarah Connor Chronicles
Season	Timeslot (ET)	Episodes	First aired		Last aired		TV season	Avg. viewers (millions)
Season	Timeslot (ET)	Episodes	Date	Viewers (millions)	Date	Viewers (millions)	TV season	Avg. viewers (millions)
1	Sunday 8:00 p.m. (1); Monday 9:00 p.m. (2–9)	9	January 13, 2008	18.36	March 3, 2008	8.29	2007–08	10.8
2	Monday 8:00 p.m. (1–13); Friday 8:00 p.m. (14–22)	22	September 8, 2008	6.34	April 10, 2009	3.60	2008–09	5.37

The series premiere in the United States was watched by 18.3 million viewers. It would become the highest-rated new scripted series of the 2007–08 television season. The second-season premiere garnered 6.3 million, down from the previous season's average.

=== Critical reception ===
On review aggregator Rotten Tomatoes, season one has a score of 76% based on reviews from 34 critics, and season two has a rating of 94% based on 16 reviews. On Metacritic, the first season has an average score of 74 out of 100 based on 24 reviews. The second season has a score of 67, based on only four reviews.

Robert Bianco of USA Today gave the premiere episode four and a half stars out of five, calling the series "smart, tough and entertaining". Gina Bellafante of The New York Times referred to it as "one of the more humanizing adventures in science fiction to arrive in quite a while". The Los Angeles Times declared the show "has heart and feeling" and "an almost Shakespearean exploration of fate vs. character" that features "plenty of really great fight scenes, and explosions, as well as neat devices developed in the future and jury-rigged in the present". Film industry journal Daily Variety declared the series pilot "a slick brand extension off this profitable assembly line" that showcases "impressive and abundant action with realistic visual effects and, frankly, plenty of eye candy between Glau and Headey". At the start of the second season, Variety praised "Headey's gritty performance as Sarah—managing to be smart, resourceful and tough, yet melancholy and vulnerable as well" and wrote that "'The Sarah Connor Chronicles' continue to deliver", getting "considerable mileage out of the constant peril" facing the characters. The Connecticut Post placed it on its list of the top 10 TV shows of 2008: "It's smart, with thought-provoking meditations on parenthood, destiny and human nature, and features good performances by Lena Headey, as Sarah, and Summer Glau."

Not all responses were positive. One report from La Lámina Corredora reported, "The pilot feels too much like a cheap remake of T2." Tim Goodman of the San Francisco Chronicle derided the entire conceptualization and production of the series. Though limited to his viewing of the first two episodes, Goodman leveled criticism against Fox for having "taken the wholly predictable course of putting a lot of money into explosions and regenerating cyborgs" but not having "paid much attention to plot, casting or writing".

In his review of the second season, Travis Fickett at IGN felt despite a few middling episodes and the restrictions of a TV budget, "[the series] turned out to be intelligent, complex and consistently operated on a deeper emotional level than anyone could have expected." Gillian Flynn of Entertainment Weekly wrote that she was "so hopeful" when the series premiered but "heading into season 2, I'm far from addicted. The show's mission boils down to 'stop the robots, save the world,' but always adds wild, often tiring convolutions." Looking back on the series, Alan Sepinwall of the Star-Ledger was disappointed by Sarah and John as well as the sluggish pace of the show; however, he felt these weaknesses were outweighed by the performances of Glau, Green, and Dillahunt as well as the writers' commitment to showing the emotional toll on the characters. He called the final episode a "terrific" finale that took the show in a new potential-filled direction.

Retrospective reviews have been positive. In 2011, IGN ranked it the 16th best sci-fi television series of all time. In 2015, IGN's Matt Fowler called it "the absolute best entry into the Terminator saga following the first two movies", while Phelim O'Neill of The Guardian wrote, "It adds a lot to the terminator lore, with much that the movies just don't have the time, or recently the sense, to cover." Gem Seddon of Inverse also found it better than recent films in the franchise, especially Terminator Genisys. Zaki Hasan, writing for the San Francisco Chronicle in 2019, called the series "one of the franchise's most fascinating forays — one whose announcement was greeted with a fair amount of skepticism but ended up working a lot better than many would have expected". Hasan went on to call the show "unfairly forgotten by many, but also ripe for rediscovery for the many ways it redefined what to expect from the brand while still remaining tonally consistent with the films at their best". Trent Moore, writing for Paste in 2024, praised the cast and called the show "the smartest and most deftly executed" continuation of the first two films.

James Cameron said in 2014, "I never really watched much of it, so I never gave it a chance... to get hooked, like you have to with a TV series." Friedman later worked with Cameron on the story for the 2019 film Terminator: Dark Fate, during which they discussed the television series. According to Friedman, Cameron said he had seen nearly every episode and divided them into three categories: "He was like, 'A certain number of them, you explore these great ideas, you did a great job with them. Then there's a series of episodes where you explored great ideas, but you didn't maybe have enough money to pull them off. And then there's a few that just convinced me, those aren't areas we need to be going in.'"

=== Awards ===
Summer Glau won a 2007 Saturn Award for Best Supporting Actress on Television, tied with Elizabeth Mitchell for Lost.

The series and its cast and crew were also nominated for the following awards:

- Saturn Award: Best Network Television Series, 2007
- Saturn Award: Best Actress on Television, 2007 (Lena Headey)
- Saturn Award: Best Network Television Series, 2008
- Saturn Award: Best Actress on Television, 2008 (Lena Headey)
- Saturn Award: Best Supporting Actor on Television, 2008 (Thomas Dekker)
- Saturn Award: Best Supporting Actress on Television, 2008 (Summer Glau)
- Teen Choice Awards: Choice TV Actress: Action, 2008 (Summer Glau)
- Teen Choice Awards: Choice TV: Breakout Show, 2008
- Teen Choice Awards: Choice TV: Female Breakout Star, 2008 (Summer Glau)
- Teen Choice Awards: Choice TV: Male Breakout Star, 2008 (Thomas Dekker)
- Teen Choice Awards: Choice TV Show: Action, 2008
- Primetime Emmy Award: Outstanding Single-Camera Picture Editing for a Drama Series, 2008 (Paul Karasick for "Pilot")
- Primetime Emmy Award: Outstanding Special Visual Effects, 2008 (James Lima, Chris Zapara, Lane Jolly, Steve Graves, Rick Schick, Jeff West and Bradley Mullennix for "Pilot")
- Primetime Emmy Award: Outstanding Stunt Coordination, 2008 (Joel Kramer for "Gnothi Seauton")
- Primetime Emmy Award: Outstanding Sound Editing for a Series, 2009 (Jon Mete, Pat Foley, Tim Farrell, David Werntz, Jerry Edemann, Michael Baber, Catherine Rose, Shelley Roden for "Mr. Ferguson Is Ill Today")
- Visual Effects Society Award: Outstanding Visual Effects in a Broadcast Series, 2008 (James Lima, Raoul Bolognini, Andrew Orloff, and Steve Meyer for "Vick's Chip")
