= Moon Bloodgood =

American model turned actress (born 1975)

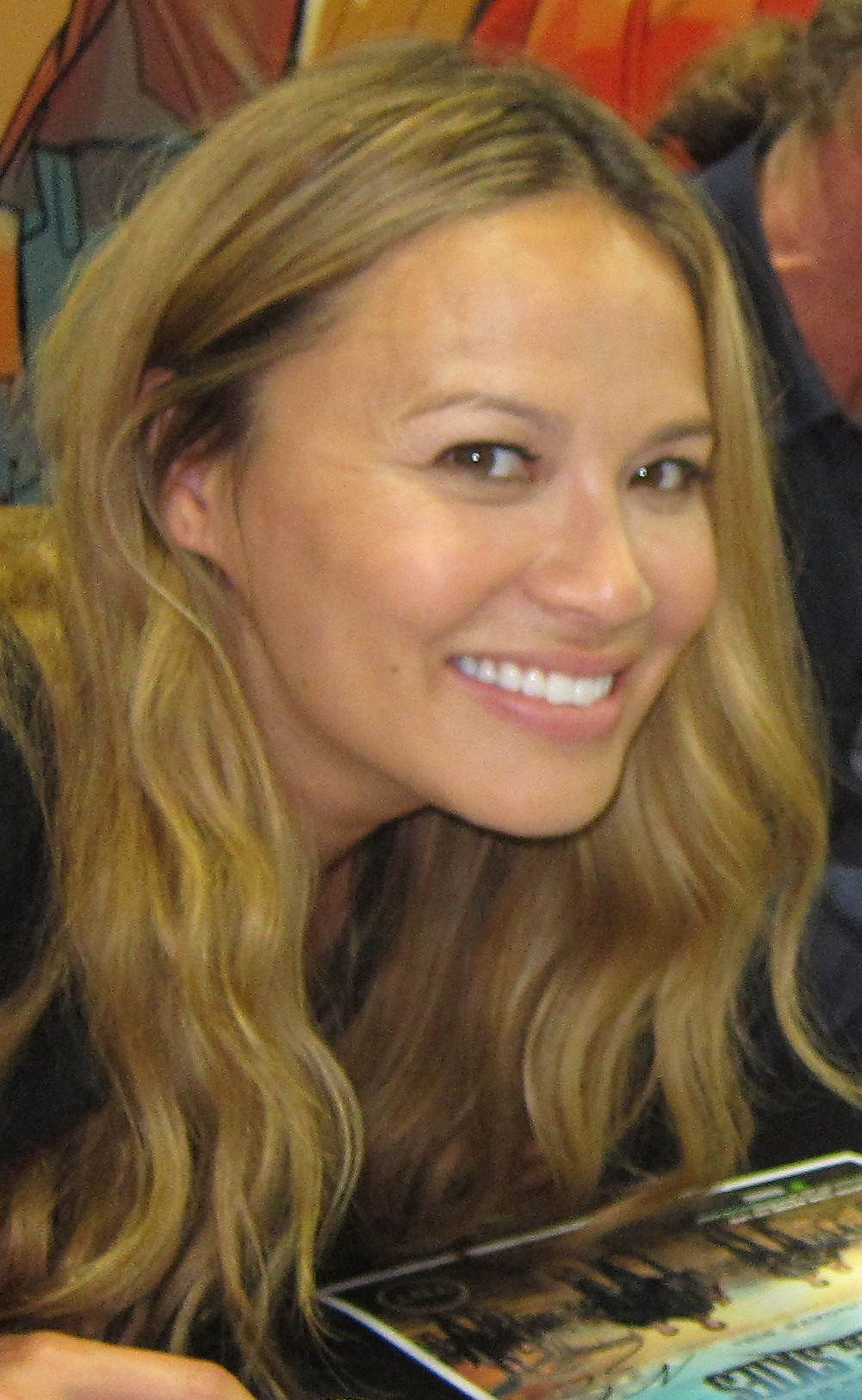
- Bloodgood in July 2012
- Born: September 20, 1975 (age 51); Alliance, Nebraska, U.S.
- Occupations: Actress, model
- Years active: 1993–present
- Spouse: Grady Hall (m. 2011)
- Children: 2

Moon Bloodgood (born September 20, 1975) is an American actress and model, known for her roles as Anne Glass in the TNT television series Falling Skies (2011–2015) and Vera in the 2012 film The Sessions.

== Early life ==
Bloodgood was born in Alliance, Nebraska, on September 20, 1975, but was raised in Anaheim, California. Her father, Shell Bloodgood, is American, and her mother, Sang Cha, is South Korean. Her father was stationed in South Korea, where he met her mother.

== Career ==
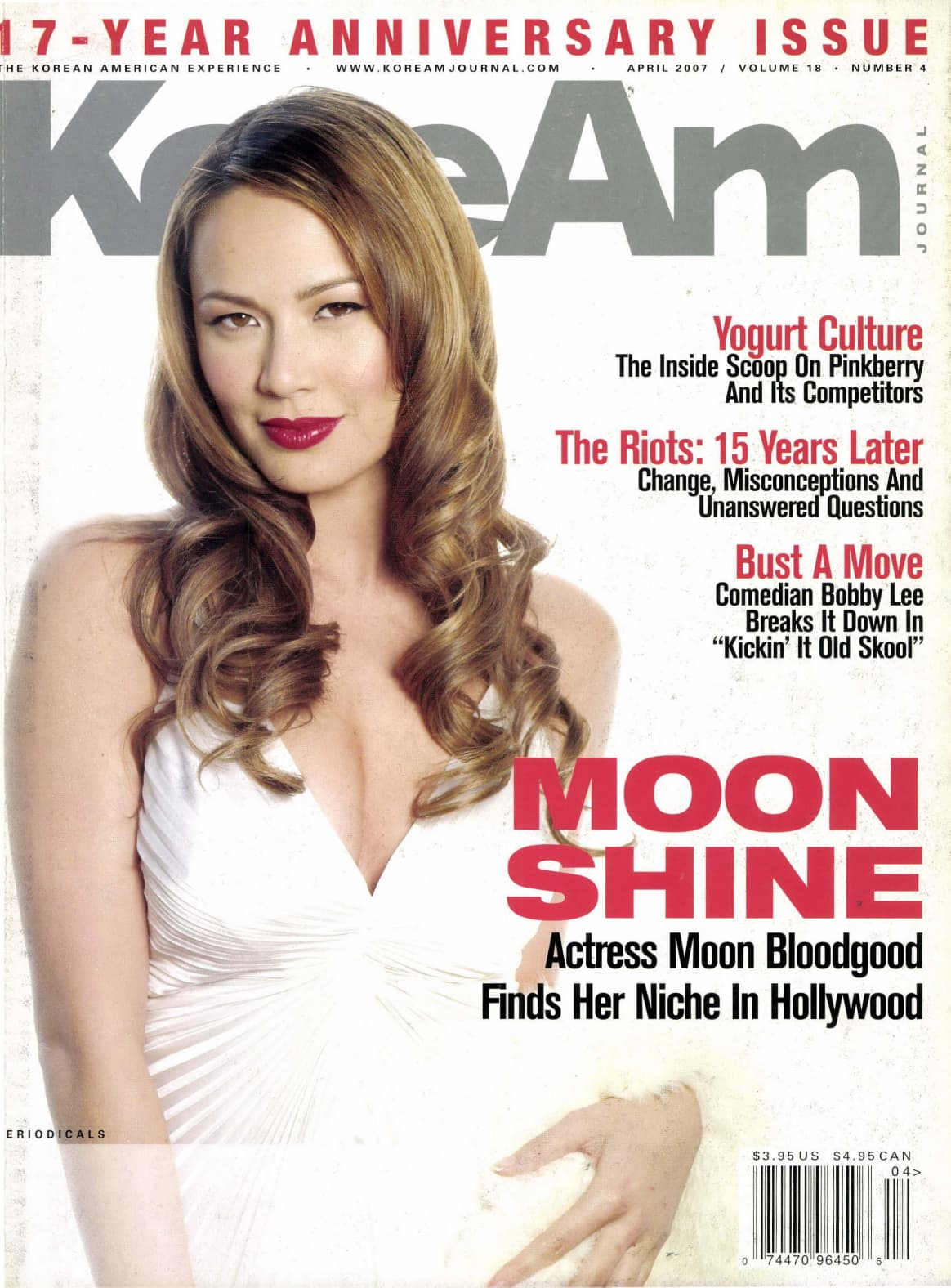
On the cover of KoreAm, April 2007

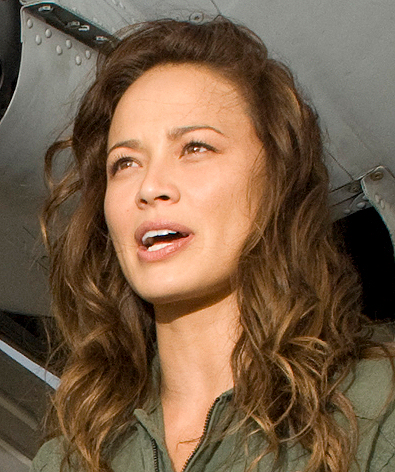
Bloodgood during publicity for Terminator Salvation, July 18, 2008

At age 17, Bloodgood became one of the Laker Girls.

In 2005, she was ranked No. 99 on Maxim magazine's Hot 100 list. She subsequently ranked No. 53 in 2006, No. 40 in 2007 and No. 20 in 2009.

In Day Break, she portrayed Rita Shelten, the girlfriend of a detective who is framed for murder and arrested in the span of a day, but continually finds himself reliving that same day. In 2007, Bloodgood starred as Livia Beale in the American science-fiction television series Journeyman on NBC.

She had a role in the movie Street Fighter: The Legend of Chun-Li, which opened in February 2009. She starred as Blair Williams in Terminator Salvation, the fourth film in the Terminator series and reprised her role in the video game and the animated prequel web series, Terminator Salvation: The Machinima Series.

In early 2009, she joined the third season of the show Burn Notice in a recurring role as Detective Michelle Paxson.

From 2011 to 2015, she portrayed Dr. Anne Glass in TNT's science fiction series Falling Skies executive produced by Steven Spielberg. At the Sundance Film Festival in 2012, Bloodgood won the "Special Jury Prize" for dramatic ensemble acting in The Sessions together with John Hawkes, Helen Hunt, and William H. Macy.

She also voice acts the role of Uriel the Archangel in the video game Darksiders.

In 2017, she was added as a series regular to the third season of the medical drama Code Black.

She was cast in a starring role for the second season of Untamed in February 2026.

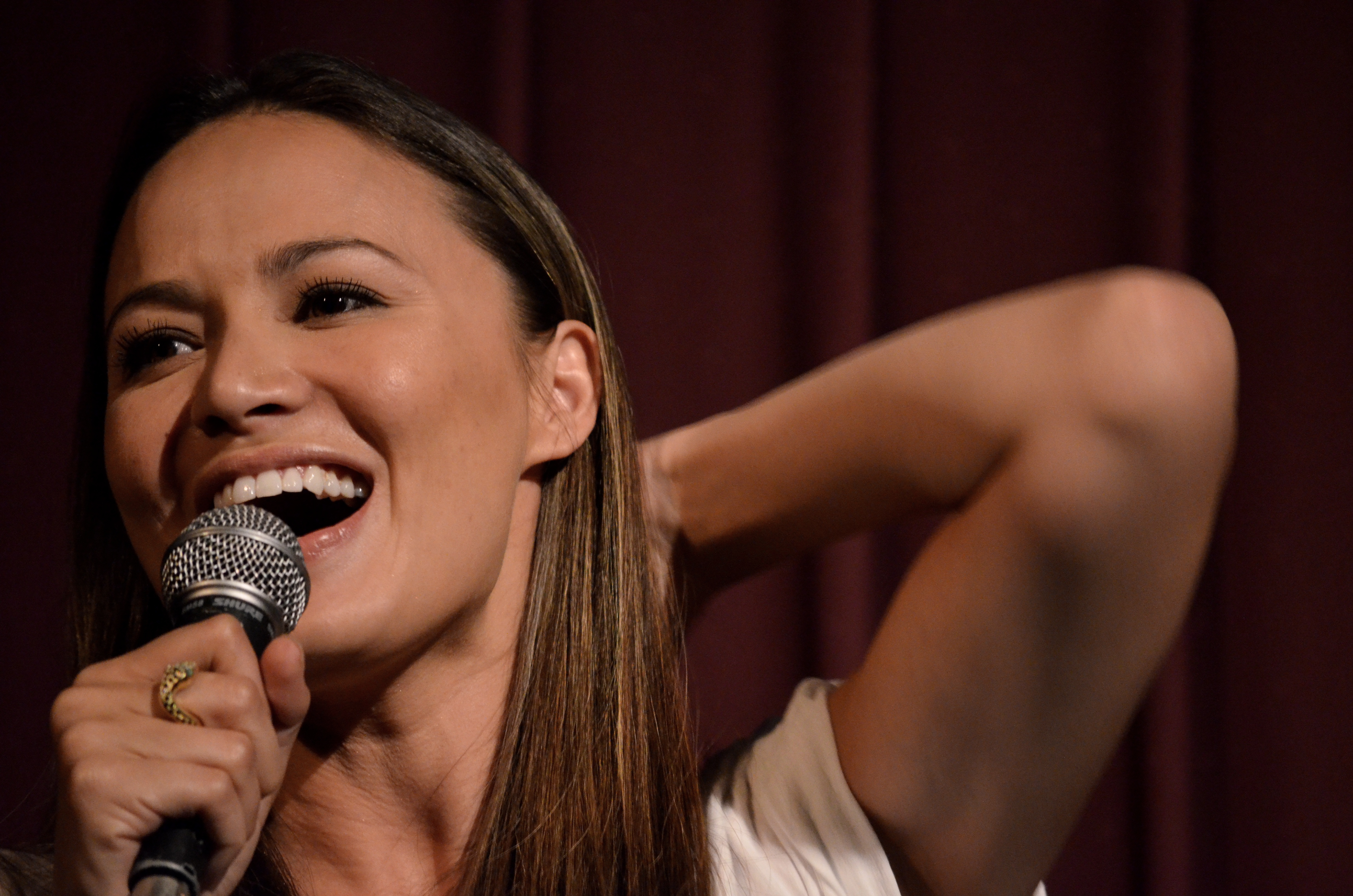
Bloodgood at a Falling Skies Q&A, 2011

== Personal life ==
In August 2011, Bloodgood married Grady Hall, an American who owns an Internet company. In December 2012, Bloodgood gave birth to their daughter, Pepper. She later had a son, Archie.

== Filmography ==
=== Film ===
Year	Title	Role	Notes
2004	Win a Date with Tad Hamilton!	Gorgeous Woman	
2005	A Lot like Love	Bridget	
2006	Moonlight Serenade	Marie Devrenier	
2006	Eight Below	Katie	
2007	Pathfinder	Starfire	
2008	What Just Happened	Laura	
2009	Street Fighter: The Legend of Chun-Li	Detective Maya Sunee	
2009	Terminator Salvation	Lieutenant Blair Williams	
2010	Faster	Marina Humpheries	
2010	Bedrooms	Beth	
2011	Beautiful Boy	Trish	
2011	Conception	Nikki	
2012	The Sessions	Vera	Sundance Film Festival's Special Jury Prize for Ensemble Acting
2013	The Power of Few	Mala	
2024	Detained	Detective Moon	

=== Television ===
Year	Title	Role	Notes
2002	Just Shoot Me!	Penny	Episode: "Halloween? Halloween!"
2003	Fastlane	Maid	Episode: "Iced"
2003	CSI: Crime Scene Investigation	Dancer	Episode: "Assume Nothing"
2005	North Shore	Maid	Episode: "Vice"
2005	Monk	Haley	Episode: "Mr. Monk Gets Cabin Fever"
2006–2008	Day Break	Rita Shelten	Main cast
2007	Journeyman	Livia Beale	Main cast
2009	Burn Notice	Detective Michelle Paxson	3 episodes
2009	Terminator Salvation: The Machinima Series	Blair Williams (voice)	6 episodes
2010	Human Target	Doctor Jessica Shaw	Episode: "Tanarak"
2011	NTSF:SD:SUV::	Vivica	Episode: "Full Hauser"
2011–2015	Falling Skies	Anne Glass	Main cast Nominated – Saturn Award for Best Actress on Television
2018	Code Black	Rox Valenzuela	Main cast (season 3)
2019–2020	NCIS: Los Angeles	Katherine Casillas	6 episodes
2022	Magnum P.I.	Judge Rachel Park	Episode: "Judge Me Not"

=== Video games ===
Year	Title	Voice role	Notes
1997	Nuclear Strike	Naja Hana	
2009	Terminator Salvation	Blair Williams	
2010	Darksiders	Uriel, The Archangel	
