= Terminator Salvation (video game) =

2009 video game

- European cover art
- Developer: Grin (Note: Additional development by Fatshark.) (Note: Mobile version developed and published by Gameloft.)
- Publishers: Equity Games; Evolved Games (Note: Distributed by Warner Bros. Interactive Entertainment.)
- Director: Ulf Andersson
- Producers: Cos Lazouras; Per Juhlén
- Writers: Corey May; Dooma Wendschuh
- Composer: Trond Viggo Melssen
- Series: Terminator
- Engine: Diesel
- Platforms: Microsoft Windows; PlayStation 3 Xbox 360 iOS; Mobile phone
- Release: iOS; May 7, 2009; PlayStation 3, Xbox 360: NA: May 19, 2009; AU: May 28, 2009; EU: May 29, 2009; Microsoft Windows: WW: May 19, 2009 (Steam); AU: May 28, 2009; EU: May 29, 2009; NA: June 15, 2009; Mobile phone May 22, 2009
- Genre: Third-person shooter
- Modes: Single-player, multiplayer

Terminator Salvation is a third-person shooter action video game, released on May 19, 2009, to coincide with the release of the film of the same title on the same week. It was developed by The Halcyon Company's gaming subsidiary, Halcyon Games, along with Grin, and published by Equity Games and Evolved Games. It was Grin's last game and was released for Microsoft Windows, PlayStation 3, Xbox 360, mobile, and iOS. It received mostly negative reviews.

Set in 2016 in Los Angeles, the console and PC versions of the game take place between the events of Terminator 3: Rise of the Machines and Terminator Salvation and follow John Connor (Gideon Emery), and his team, consisting of Angie Salter (Rose McGowan), Barnes (Common) and Blair Williams (Moon Bloodgood). Christian Bale refused to lend his voice and likeness to the game. Rose McGowan voiced the game-exclusive character Angie Salter, who is an ex-high school teacher. Common and Moon Bloodgood voiced their characters from the film (Barnes and Blair, respectively). An animated web series, Terminator Salvation: The Machinima Series, takes place before the game, and was released by Machinima in May 2009.

== Gameplay ==
Game screenshot of Terminator Salvation. John Connor uses a Remington Model 870 to shoot an Aerostat.

Terminator Salvation is a third-person shooter where the player needs to "constantly move, flank, cover and utilize their squad to progress." The player must battle Skynet enemies from the film of the same name as well as new enemies specifically designed for the game.

The game features a campaign that can be played alone or cooperatively with one other local player via split-screen. The co-op version of the game enables players to play as both John Connor and his teammate Blair Williams.

The game employs a cover and movement system not unlike those featured in Gears of War and Brothers in Arms: Hell's Highway, wherein the player can quickly choose to dodge between different forms of cover, coming out only to fire shots at enemies. Staying in cover is advantageous, as the player only regenerates health when they have not received damage for a certain amount of time (as in the Halo and Call of Duty games). Although players initially are only equipped with an M4 carbine, other weapons such as the RPG-7 and M79 grenade launcher, Remington 870 shotgun, and M249 SAW as well as various types of grenades (Flash and fragmentation) are acquired throughout the game. Enemy A.I. is relatively strong, both keeping track of the player's location realistically (that is, not omniscient but using sight and sound to locate the player) as well as actively pursuing and flanking them when cover is sought by the player.

== Plot ==
=== Console & Windows version ===
Years after Judgment Day, John Connor reflects on the old days of preparing for the future battle. Returning to an evac point with Blair Williams and other soldiers, they battle their way through machines to discover that there are no helicopters waiting for them. Escaping in trucks instead, the group is attacked by a Hunter-Killer aircraft. After John Connor manages to destroy the H-K, a T-600 appears and kills several members of his team.

The team travels underground, then above again, battling machines. The surviving trio manages to reach the evacuation point, meeting soldiers. Aerostat drones attack, and John, Blair and others go outside to take care of them. A Resistance team led by soldier David Weston (Sean Cory Cooper) asks for help, but his transmission is lost. The team then tries to make a landing place for a helicopter. The chopper lands and rescues the team, but John and Blair stay behind to rescue David's team.

A rescue team, Epsilon, has a helicopter going down, so the duo goes to its crash-site to check for survivors. They rescue four soldiers, Angie (Rose McGowan), an unknown, Deckard (Joe Camareno) and Dobkin (Nolan North). They fight a legion of machines and then, afterwards, decide to head for an old Resistance outpost. Deckard and the unknown are killed by a T-600, and the team is forced to retreat. They manage to destroy two T-600s. They have no choice but to retreat, but with no way out, the team is forced to destroy the T-600s, though Dobkin is mortally wounded in the fight.

The three continue to go to Skynet while defending themselves. They decide to go to a tower so they can observe Skynet patrols so as to plan a route to rescue David. They encounter T-600s with rubber skin, which the trio destroy. John warns the other two about the T-800, which has real, vat-grown skin. They reach the tower, where they encounter a Hunter-Killer, but John, Blair and Angie manage to destroy it. There are too many machines on a nearby street that they planned to go down, so the three decide to go to Union Station at the subway, following the tracks to Skynet.

They traverse their way to a hidden survivalist camp. The survivalists do not trust them at first (because of the T-600s with rubber skin), but they manage to gain their trust. They say they have not encountered Skynet for a long time. The leader, named Warren Campbell (Ed O' Ross), leads him to Barnes (Common), who will supply them. Machines come, and John, Blair and Barnes fight off the machines while Warren and Angie evacuate the area. Barnes reveals to John that machines actually come every two months. They destroy the machines with detonators, and everybody evacuates by train. John and Blair defend the train by missile launcher. They stop to rescue other people from machines and succeed. They escape, but the train derails, so they go on foot to a truck depot, meeting up with other soldiers. Warren drives a school bus, while John and Blair defend it, eventually saving the bus. They go their separate ways, but Warren says they can visit them anytime. Warren still has doubts of their plan, saying that they can not communicate as long as a Skynet communications tower still stands. Barnes joins the three, saying he is tired of running and wishes to join the Resistance.

Battling numerous machines to infiltrate the Skynet compound, an alarm is accidentally triggered when Connor steals important documents. While Barnes sets up explosives, John, Blair and Angie old off T-600s and T-7-T's. While the explosives go off, they run into the elevator to escape. However, with the control panel located outside, Angie sacrifices herself so that John and the others can return to the surface. John is racked with guilt, but Blair explains that he had helped Angie fight, and she believed he could help humanity win.

Later, John is fixing what appears to be a vehicle. He calls his base (answered by teammate Linda (Lupe)), saying he needs airpower to rescue David's team. Linda says it is going to be a problem, because of a harvester. "That won't be a problem", John says, because he reprogrammed a Hunter-Killer tank, and programmed it to go straight to Skynet. He does not have control of the guns, though. That quickly changes when Warren's team returns, with the access codes to the guns and Warren apologizes.

They first have to locate and destroy Skynet's anti-aircraft turrets. They destroy four areas of turrets and machines, but the tank takes too much damage. John suggests that they could deactivate them on foot. John, Blair and Barnes are joined by three men to deactivate the turrets and to find David's men. Warren and the others cover John by destroying as many machines as possible.

They traverse Skynet and destroy all machines that they encounter, until they found Weston and his men. Warren's men agreed to escort them to the vehicles, while John, Blair, David and Barnes go through the service tunnels to deactivate the turrets.

The four tried to make it to the control room. John shuts down the machines for a few minutes, enough time to get them out of Skynet. The four attempt to escape Skynet before they destroy the base. With the four of them safe, they all return to their Resistance camp. Connor narrates, saying that he has gained faith by what he is about to create in the future, instead of the past.

=== iOS version ===
The game takes place in the year 2018. John Connor arrives via a helicopter in Los Angeles to assist a squad of resistance fighters. The captain of the squad tells him to reach a bunker. Upon reaching the bunker, he is informed that some of the Resistance fighters got trapped in it and is tasked with rescuing them. After John rescues the fighters, the captain informs him that the bunker is going to explode. John is successfully able to escape from the bunker.

A team of resistance fighters carrying a special transmitter in the city was given a mission to call airstrikes on a Hunter-Killer tank to destroy it and recover its remains for research. However the team got attacked and was scattered. It fell upon John to recover the transmitter and complete the mission. While recovering the transmitter parts, he encounters the H-K tank. He is given the last transmitter part by a member of the team who tells him to find a way around the H-K tank through a nearby house in order to call upon an airstrike on it. John is successful in calling an airstrike on the H-K tank and it is destroyed.

The game then shifts to Marcus Wright who awakens among the ruins of Los Angeles but has no idea where he is. He befriends a young Kyle Reese. They both decide to escape the city and join the Resistance. Marcus goes to the hills where he hopes to find a working car. Marcus is attacked by a Hunter-Killer aircraft in a parking lot although he is able to destroy it. Marcus is able to find a vehicle and along with Kyle tries to escape out of the city in it. While driving, they spot a Harvester near them. They try to avoid being detected by him while driving but it's able to discover them and chases after them. However they are able to take it down and escape the city.

The game then shifts back to John. The intel gathered from the destroyed H-K tank showed the location of Skynet's base and John decides to enter it alone. The way to the base is guarded by a H-K tank which he is able to destroy. He rides to the base using a Moto-Terminator taken down by the Resistance. In the base he encounters a T-700 which he destroys. The base defences catch John by surprise and injure him, but he manages to escape and blow up the complex. The game ends with John seeing the complex destroy inside the pupil of his eye.

== Development ==
The game was announced on November 15, 2007, when the Halcyon Company also announced the formation of Halcyon Games, the video game arm of the studio. It had been in development for several months at Grin and Halcyon Games, before filming took place. Peter Levin, a former Disney executive, headed up Halcyon Games as acting CEO. The CEO revealed that Halcyon decided to develop the game internally rather than contract another studio to create the game. Taito was responsible for marketing and publishing the game in Japan on September 19, 2009.

Although a multiplayer mode was originally planned it was decidedly dropped to allow the game to be released on schedule. With Halcyon developments' VP Cos Lazouras stating "It is my opinion to do less better, than more but mediocre. We did get local co-op in which is incredibly cool."

== Reception ==
Reception

Aggregate scores
Aggregator	Score
GameRankings	iOS: 83%
Metacritic	PC: 49/100; PS3: 43/100; X360: 48/100

Review scores
Publication	Score
1Up.com	D+
Destructoid	3/10
Edge	3/10
Eurogamer	2/10
Game Informer	5.5/10
GamePro	2/5
GameSpot	5/10
GameSpy	1.5/5
GameTrailers	4.7/10
GameZone	6/10
Giant Bomb	3/5
IGN	(iOS) 7/10; 6.3/10

Terminator Salvation received mixed reviews from critics. Acclaim depended on the platform the game was on. GameRankings gave the iOS version a score of 83%, and Metacritic gave the game 48 out of 100 for the Xbox 360 version, 43 out of 100 for the PlayStation 3 version, and 49 out of 100 for the PC version.

GameSpot reviewer Chris Watters rated it a 5 out of 10, citing the repetitive combat, mediocre visuals, short length, and that the lead actor of the film, Christian Bale, did not do the voice acting for the game's John Connor. Hilary Goldstein of IGN gave all console versions except the iOS version a 6.3 out 10 for its passable visuals, good ally A.I., and complete lack of replay value. He also criticized it because Bale's voice was missing. In the video review, IGN did not like Bale not voicing or the short game, but liked the enemy A.I. and the cover system.
