= The Halcyon Company =

American media development company

- Type: Private
- Industry: Film industry
- Predecessor: C2 Pictures; Seasonal Film Corporation
- Founded: 2007; 19 years ago
- Defunct: 2009; 17 years ago (production company); 2013; 13 years ago (official)
- Fate: Bankruptcy, assets and name now owned by StudioCanal (production company); Officially dissolved in 2013, replaced by Skydance Media for all future Terminator film franchise
- Successor: StudioCanal; Skydance Media (for all future Terminator film franchise)
- Headquarters: Los Angeles, California
- Key people: Derek Anderson (co-CEO); Victor Kubicek (co-CEO)
- Products: Terminator franchise
- Divisions: Halcyon Games
- Website: thehalcyoncompany.com

The Halcyon Company was an American media development company headed by Victor Kubicek and Derek Anderson. They were perhaps best known for acquiring the global rights to the Terminator franchise in 2007 and for producing Terminator Salvation, which was released worldwide in the summer of 2009.

== History ==
The company was founded by Victor Kubicek and Derek Anderson in 2006. Prior to teaming up in Los Angeles, Anderson had a New York and London-based advertising agency, In The Mix, and Kubicek worked as a trader on the American Stock Exchange. Afterward, they produced Cook Off!, a short film mockumentary which won an award at the Aspen Comedy Festival. Halcyon then aimed to get the rights to respected intellectual property.

In May 2007, Halcyon acquired all of the rights in relationship to the Terminator franchise. These rights include the right to produce any future Terminator films, as well as all future merchandising and licensing rights, certain future revenues derived from Terminator 3: Rise of the Machines, as well as certain rights in the television project Terminator: The Sarah Connor Chronicles and the sole right to produce all future Terminator projects in any new or existing media. In November 2007, the company created its own video games subsidiary, Halcyon Games and made a video game adaptation of Terminator Salvation. In October 2007, Halcyon acquired the first-look rights to the works of writer Philip K. Dick. An adaptation of Flow My Tears, the Policeman Said was deemed to enter works in 2009. The arrangement with the production arm of the Philip K. Dick Estate, Electric Shepherd Productions, ended August 2009 due to delayed payments.

Warner Bros. acquired the North American distribution rights, allowing them to distribute the fourth Terminator film, Terminator Salvation. The film began production in early 2008, and was released on May 21, 2009. Despite making a healthy profit on the movie, Halcyon filed for bankruptcy in 2009 as a response to a lawsuit from their financier due to payment problems. Their next film was supposed to be a remake of the film After the Wedding set for a 2011 release. The rights were put up in a bankruptcy auction, and acquired in 2010 by Pacificor, a hedge fund company who was the largest creditor in Halcyon's bankruptcy proceedings. The deal erased Halcyon's debts owed to Pacificor and guaranteed Halcyon $5 million for each additional Terminator sequel produced to pay off other outstanding debts. In 2011, Megan Ellison bought the franchise rights at auction for $20 million; they were later acquired by her brother David Ellison's company, Skydance Media.

In 2013, Kubicek and Anderson released In God We Trust, a documentary they directed about Eleanor Squillari, Bernie Madoff's secretary for 25 years and her search for the truth about the fraud. That year, they acquired the rights to Beatrix Ost's memory books to release a film adaptation.

== Films ==
- Cook Off! (2006, short)
- Terminator Salvation (2009)
- In God We Trust (2013)
