= Terminator Salvation =

2009 American film by McG

- Theatrical release poster
- Directed by: McG
- Written by: John Brancato; Michael Ferris
- Produced by: Moritz Borman; Jeffrey Silver; Victor Kubicek; Derek Anderson
- Starring: Christian Bale; Sam Worthington; Anton Yelchin; Moon Bloodgood; Bryce Dallas Howard; Common; Jane Alexander; Helena Bonham Carter
- Cinematography: Shane Hurlbut
- Edited by: Conrad Buff
- Music by: Danny Elfman
- Production companies: The Halcyon Company; Wonderland Sound and Vision
- Distributed by: Warner Bros. Pictures (United States and Canada); Columbia Pictures (International; through Sony Pictures Releasing International) (Note: excludes the Middle East (Gulf Film), and South Korea (Lotte Entertainment and Mars Entertainment))
- Release date: May 21, 2009
- Running time: 115 minutes
- Country: United States
- Language: English
- Budget: $200 million
- Box office: $371.4 million

Terminator Salvation is a 2009 American action film. It is the fourth installment of the Terminator franchise, serving as a sequel to Terminator 3: Rise of the Machines (2003). (Note: The film takes place after the previous Terminator films, but follows the films' canonical time-travel alterations, ultimately retconning certain events in the form of an alternate timeline.) It is directed by McG and written by John Brancato and Michael Ferris. It is the only Terminator film to date not to feature Arnold Schwarzenegger, though his likeness briefly appears digitally. Instead, it stars Christian Bale and Sam Worthington with Anton Yelchin, Moon Bloodgood, Bryce Dallas Howard, Common, Michael Ironside, and Helena Bonham Carter in supporting roles. In a departure from the previous installments, Salvation is a post-apocalyptic film set in the year 2018. It focuses on the war between Skynet's machine network and humanity, as the remnants of the world's militaries have united to form the Resistance to fight against Skynet. Bale portrays John Connor, a Resistance fighter and central character, while Worthington portrays cyborg Marcus Wright. Yelchin plays a young Kyle Reese, a character first introduced in The Terminator (1984), and the film depicts the origins of the T-800 Terminator.

After troubled pre-production, with the Halcyon Company acquiring the rights from Andrew G. Vajna and Mario Kassar, and with several writers working on the screenplay, filming began in May 2008 in New Mexico, and ran for 77 days.

Terminator Salvation was released on May 21, 2009, by Warner Bros. Pictures in the United States, and by Sony Pictures Releasing under its Columbia Pictures label internationally. It received mixed-to-negative reviews from critics and underperformed at the box office, grossing over $371 million on a $200 million budget. While originally intended to be the first installment of a second Terminator trilogy, these plans were canceled following the Halcyon Company filing for bankruptcy after the film's release. The franchise rights were sold in 2012 to Annapurna Pictures, resulting in Terminator Genisys, a reboot of the series, being released in 2015 with Schwarzenegger reprising his role.

== Plot ==
In 2003, Dr. Serena Kogan of Cyberdyne Systems convinces death row inmate Marcus Wright to sign over his body for medical research following his execution. Sometime later, the automated Skynet system is activated, becomes self-aware, and perceives humans as a threat to its existence, starting a nuclear holocaust known as "Judgment Day". (Note: As depicted in Terminator 3: Rise of the Machines (2003))

In 2018, John Connor leads an assault on a Skynet facility, where he discovers schematics revealing that human prisoners are being used to harvest living tissue for a new Terminator model—the T-800. This breakthrough occurs years ahead of schedule because Skynet has acquired data about its own future timeline. John survives a nuclear explosion on the base and proceeds to extraction. Following John's departure, Marcus emerges from the base's wreckage and begins heading toward Los Angeles.

John heads to the Resistance headquarters aboard a Los Angeles-class submarine and confronts General Ashdown and the Resistance commanders. They reveal that the Resistance has discovered a hidden signal that they believe can shut down Skynet's machines and plans to launch an offensive against Skynet's headquarters in San Francisco in four days due to an intercepted kill list created by Skynet, which will eliminate the Resistance's leaders within the same time frame. John learns that he is second on this list, after Kyle Reese, realizing Skynet has learned that Kyle will eventually travel back in time and become his father. (Note: As depicted in The Terminator (1984))

Arriving in L.A., Marcus encounters Kyle and a mute child named Star during a skirmish with Skynet's machines. Kyle and Star are subsequently abducted and taken prisoner by Skynet. Two Resistance A-10 airplanes are shot down while trying to intercept a machine transport. Marcus rescues downed pilot Blair Williams, and they make their way to John's base, where a magnetic land mine wounds Marcus. Attempting to save his life, the Resistance discovers that Marcus is a cyborg, with a cybernetic endoskeleton, a partially artificial cerebral cortex, and a human heart. Although Marcus insists that he is human, John and his wife, Kate, suspect that Marcus has been sent to kill them, and John orders him to be executed. Blair helps Marcus escape. During the pursuit, Marcus saves John from Skynet's hydrobots, and the two make a bargain: Marcus will enter Skynet's headquarters in San Francisco to help John rescue Kyle and the other prisoners if he lets him live.

John pleads with Ashdown to delay the offensive so he can formulate a plan to extract the human captives, but Ashdown refuses and relieves John of his command. However, the Resistance disobeys Ashdown's orders and instead awaits John's signal. Marcus enters the base, interfaces with the computer, and disables perimeter defenses so that John can infiltrate and release the prisoners. Marcus learns from Skynet that he was resurrected to lure John to the base; when the Resistance launches its attack, John will be killed, achieving Skynet's goal. The hidden signal that the Resistance received earlier is revealed to be a ruse, and Skynet uses it to track down and destroy the Resistance command submarine.

Refusing to accept his fate, Marcus tears out the hardware linking him to Skynet and leaves to aid John. John locates Kyle and Star, but a T-800 Terminator ambushes them. As Kyle and Star escape, Marcus appears and fights the T-800, while John rigs together nuclear fuel cells to destroy the facility. Marcus is outmatched and temporarily disabled until John comes to his aid, after which John is stabbed through the chest by the T-800. Marcus destroys the T-800 by tearing its head off, and he, John, Kyle, and Star are airlifted out. John detonates the explosives, destroying the entire base.

John's injury is fatal as his heart was damaged. Marcus offers his heart for transplantation, sacrificing himself to save John. As he recovers, John radios to the Resistance that, although this battle has been won, the war continues.

== Cast ==
- Christian Bale as John Connor. Director McG deemed Bale "the most credible action star in the world" during development. McG wanted Bale for Marcus, but the actor—even though he "can't really remember why"—wanted to play John, and that led to the character's role getting expanded in rewrites of the script. Bale was the first person to be cast and signed on for the role in November 2007. McG talked extensively with Bale in the UK about the role while the latter was filming The Dark Knight, and they both agreed to proceed. Although a fan of the Terminator series, he was at first uninterested until McG convinced him the story would be character-based and not rely on special effects. They kept working on the story every day, along with Worthington. McG said Bale broke his hand punching a Terminator prop during filming. Bale spent six to eight hours each day with McG in the editing room to advise the finished product. In January 2018, Bale revealed he rejected the role three times before accepting it, in part to spite those who told him not to take the role.
- Sam Worthington as Marcus Wright: A human-Terminator hybrid cyborg. Worthington compared Marcus to Dorothy (The Wonderful Wizard of Oz) and Alice (Alice's Adventures in Wonderland) due to being "this person waking up in another world [who then] tries to find himself". Terminator creator James Cameron personally recommended Worthington (whom he directed in Avatar) to McG. Russell Crowe also recommended him to McG. The director decided Worthington looked tougher than the "great many of today's [waify] young male actors". Worthington recalled Cameron told him "the Terminator to make is the one with the war". Worthington tore his intercostal muscles during the first weeks of filming but nevertheless insisted on performing his own stunts. McG once expressed interest in casting Christian Bale, Daniel Day-Lewis or Josh Brolin in the part. Brolin did talk to Bale and read a draft of the screenplay, which he found "interesting and dark; ultimately, though, I didn't think it felt right".
- Anton Yelchin as Kyle Reese: A teenage refugee and admirer of John Connor and the Resistance. As portrayed by Michael Biehn in The Terminator, he was sent back in time to 1984 to protect Sarah Connor to ensure the survival of the human race, and fathered John with her. Yelchin said he wanted to portray Kyle as Biehn did and not make him appear weaker because it was a younger version of the character. The difference in his portrayal lies in showing Kyle as intense, but not concentrated until he joins the resistance proper. Yelchin tried to convey Kyle's intensity by focusing on how fast Biehn appeared when running in the original film.
- Moon Bloodgood as Blair Williams: A "no-nonsense and battle-hardened" pilot of the Resistance who suffers from survivor's guilt and serves as a romantic interest for Marcus. McG characterizes her as continuing the feminine strength that has been prominent throughout the franchise.
- Bryce Dallas Howard as Kate Connor: The wife of John Connor and daughter of Robert Brewster, who supervised the development of Skynet. Charlotte Gainsbourg was originally set to play the part, but left due to scheduling conflicts with another film. As portrayed by Claire Danes in the third film, Kate was a veterinarian; but in this film, she is now a physician. Howard suggested, as part of the character's backstory, that Kate studied medical books and interviewed many surviving doctors after the events of Judgment Day. The film's subject matter reminded her of developing countries, devastated by war and lacking basic supplies such as clean water, which "reflects things that are going on currently in this privileged world that we are living in where there hasn't been an apocalypse and robots haven't taken over the world. I think that's something definitely for us to reinvestigate and that we continue to make choices for our own future to take that into consideration". Howard focused on Kate "being accustomed to fear and loss" because the character was a military brat.
- Common as Barnes: John's right-hand man. Common stated the character was not overly developed, being "only just a bad-ass character, you know, really the big heavy of the movie", before McG's intervention. Common agreed with this, as "I didn't want to just be the big, bulky guy there" and worked on the emotional side, "thinking about how it would be in a world that's post-apocalyptic, a world where, you know, things have been destroyed and we're really fighting for survival."
- Jane Alexander as Virginia: The leader of a group of human refugees.
- Helena Bonham Carter as Dr. Serena Kogan / Skynet: An ex-Cyberdyne scientist who convinces Marcus to donate his body for her research. Her face is later used by the Skynet computer to communicate with Marcus. Tilda Swinton was originally considered for the part, but Bonham Carter replaced her before filming. She accepted the part because her then-domestic partner, Tim Burton, was a Terminator fan. Her role was a "small but pivotal" one and would only require ten days of shooting. However, on July 20, 2008, Bonham Carter delayed filming by a day, and was given an indefinite leave due to the death of four of her family members in a minibus accident in South Africa.
- Michael Ironside as General Ashdown: The leader of the Resistance.
- Ivan G'Vera as General Losenko: A member of the Resistance.
- Roland Kickinger as T-800: The first Terminator covered in living tissue. Bodybuilder and actor Kickinger, who previously portrayed Schwarzenegger in the 2005 biographical film See Arnold Run, was his physical double on set. When asked about his role, Kickinger said it is "Arnold's character in the first Terminator. That's basically my role, but 20 years before, so it establishes how the Terminator came about." Polish strongman athlete Mariusz Pudzianowski was also considered for doubling Schwarzenegger. If Schwarzenegger had decided not to lend his appearance to the film, then John would have shot the T-800's face off before the audience got a good look at him.
  - Arnold Schwarzenegger's facial likeness was recreated with CGI, with a mold of his face made in 1984 scanned to create the digital makeup. Schwarzenegger gave his consent to appear this way, due to being unavailable because he was serving as the Governor of California.
- Jadagrace Berry as Star: An 8-year-old girl in Kyle's care. Born after Judgment Day, Star is mute due to the trauma of the post-apocalyptic world. Therefore, this has given her the unnatural ability to sense when a Skynet unit is approaching.
- Brian Steele as the T-600.
- Linda Hamilton as the voice of Sarah Connor: John's mother who died years ago of leukemia. In two scenes of the film, John plays Sarah's recorded cassette tapes for more information regarding Kyle Reese, Marcus Wright and Skynet's Terminators. Hamilton was uncredited for the role, and was the only actor from previous films to return.

== Production ==
=== Development ===
In 1999, two years after C2 Pictures purchased the rights, two Terminator films' premises were mapped out and were supposed to be developed simultaneously. Tedi Sarafian was hired to write Terminator 3: Rise of the Machines, which he eventually received shared story credit for, while David C. Wilson was to write Terminator 4. Before any revisions were done, T3 initially took place in 2001 and revolved around the first attacks between Skynet and humans. T4 would follow immediately afterward and centered primarily on the war briefly seen in the first two films. Warner Bros. Pictures gave the film the codename "Project Angel".

Following the release of Terminator 3 in 2003, producers Andrew G. Vajna and Mario Kassar contracted Nick Stahl and Claire Danes to return as John Connor and Kate Brewster in another film. Director Jonathan Mostow helped develop the script, written by John Brancato and Michael Ferris, and was set to begin production in 2005 after completing another film. It was known by then that Arnold Schwarzenegger's role would be limited, as he had assumed office as Governor of California. The producers sought to have Warner Bros. finance the picture as they did for Terminator 3. In 2005, Stahl said John and Kate would be recast as the story jumped forward in time. By 2006, Metro-Goldwyn-Mayer (a successor to Orion Pictures and current owners of the Hemdale Film Corporation library, distributor and producer of the original film, respectively) was set to distribute the fourth film as part of the new CEO Harry Sloan's scheme to make the studio a viable Hollywood player.

On May 9, 2007, it was announced that production rights to the Terminator series had passed from the feuding Vajna and Kassar to the Halcyon Company. The producers hoped to start a new trilogy. The purchase was financed with a loan by Pacificor, a hedge fund from Santa Monica. By July 19, the project was in legal limbo due to a lawsuit between MGM and Halcyon subsidiary T Asset. MGM had an exclusive window of 30 days to negotiate for distribution of the Terminator films. When negotiating for Terminator 4, Halcyon rejected their initial proposal, and MGM suspended negotiations. After the 30 days were over, MGM claimed that the period during which negotiations were suspended did not count and their exclusive period was still open. Halcyon asked a court for an injunction allowing them to approach other distributors. Later, the lawsuit was settled and MGM got a 30-day right of first refusal to finance and distribute the fifth Terminator film.

Finally, Warner Bros. paid $60 million to acquire the United States distribution rights of Terminator Salvation; Sony Pictures also paid just over $100 million to acquire the film's distribution rights in all international territories (excluding South Korea and the Middle East, where it was respectively distributed by Lotte Entertainment and Mars Entertainment, and Gulf Film).

=== Writing ===
McG signed on to direct, as the first two films were among his favorites, and he had even cast Robert Patrick (who played the T-1000) in his previous films. Though he was initially unsure about "flogging a dead horse," he felt the post-apocalyptic setting allowed the film to be different enough so as not to be just an inferior sequel. The idea that events in Terminator 2: Judgment Day and Terminator 3: Rise of the Machines altered the future allowed them to be flexible with their presentation of the futuristic world. McG met with the series' co-creator James Cameron, and, although he neither blessed nor denigrated the project, Cameron told the new director he had faced a similar challenge when following Ridley Scott's Alien with Aliens. He maintained two elements of the previous films; that John is an outsider to the authorities, and someone of future importance is being protected, and in this film, it is Kyle Reese.

The first full screenplay for the film was written by Terminator 3 writers John Brancato and Michael Ferris, who received full screenplay credit. Paul Haggis rewrote Brancato and Ferris's script, and Shawn Ryan made another revision three weeks before filming. Jonathan Nolan also wrote on set, which led to McG to say, "I would have to characterize John as the lead writer of the film." In response to whether or not Nolan would receive a writing credit for his contribution, McG went on to say, "I don't know how the WGA rules work, but honest to goodness, we did the heaviest lifting with John." Nolan contributed to the film after Bale signed on and created Connor's arc of becoming a leader. Unfortunately according to its main actor Christian Bale, due to the 2007–08 Writers Guild of America strike, Nolan had to abruptly leave the project due to another commitment. Anthony E. Zuiker contributed to the script as well. So extensive were the rewrites that Alan Dean Foster decided to rewrite the entire novelization after submitting it to his publisher because the compiled shooting script was very different from the one he was given beforehand.

You survived the nuclear holocaust and you crawl out of the hole after three-to-five years and say, 'Well, I know what's going on—I'm the one!' Some SAS guy isn't going to say, 'Where do I go, boss?' He'd say, 'Shut the fuck up and get in line.'

— McG on John's struggles to become the leader.

In the early script drafts, John was a secondary character. Producer James Middleton explained "Ben-Hur was influenced by Jesus Christ, but it was his story. Much in that way, this [new main] character will be influenced by John Connor." The original ending was to have John killed, and his image kept alive by the resistance by grafting his skin onto Marcus' cybernetic body. Marcus would have then murdered Kate, Barnes, Kyle, and Star. However, after the ending was leaked on the Internet, Warner Bros. decided to completely change the entire third act of the film. McG and Nolan did continue the Christ element of John's character though, in which he has some followers who believe what he knows about Skynet and others who do not.

McG described the film's theme as "where you draw the line between machines and humans". The friendship between Marcus—who was executed (for murder) when humanity still ruled the world—and Kyle Reese illustrates how war and suffering can bring out the best in people, such as when they worked together to survive during the Blitz. The title was derived from this second chance given to humanity and to Marcus, in addition to John's efforts to save humanity from the machines. The film's original title was Terminator Salvation: The Future Begins, but this was dropped during filming.

Throughout writing, the cast and crew would watch scenes from the three films to pick moments to reference or tribute, including "Come with me if you want to live" and "I'll be back", which is uttered by John in this film. McG found himself having to decide which ideas for references would be included and which would not. An opening scene has John fighting a Terminator on a crashed helicopter, which was storyboarded as an homage to the climax of the original film, where his mother Sarah, having broken her leg, is chased by a crippled Terminator. McG did this to reflect the skills John learned from her.

=== Filming ===
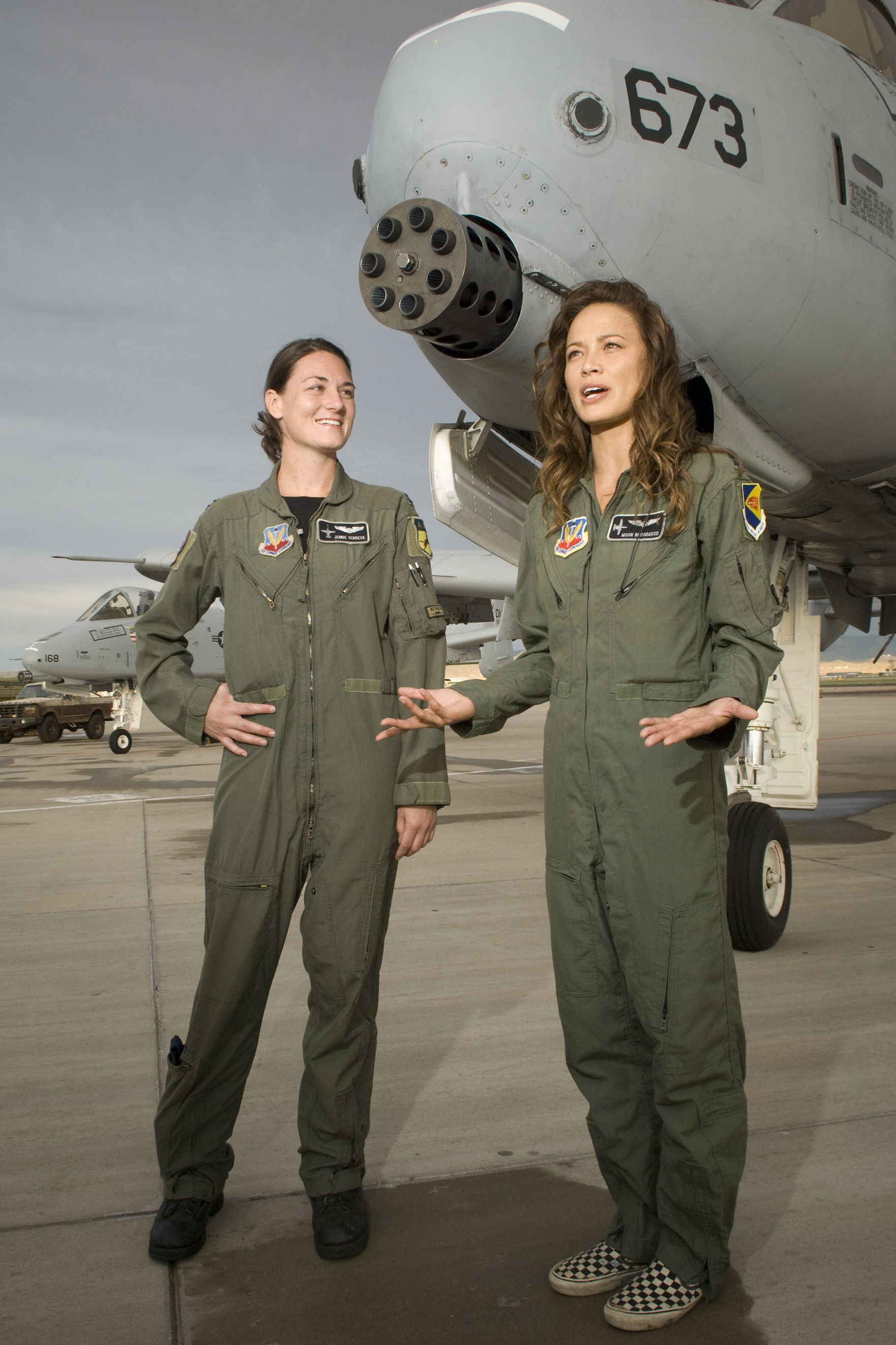
Capt. Jennie Schoeck and actress Moon Bloodgood with an A-10 Thunderbolt II during the production of Terminator Salvation at Kirtland Air Force Base in Albuquerque, New Mexico

With an estimated $200 million budget, Terminator Salvation is the most expensive Terminator film to date, followed closely by Terminator: Dark Fate (2019) (estimated budget $185-$196 million). The shooting of the film started on May 5, 2008, in New Mexico, with parts of the filming taking place at Kirtland Air Force Base, after the United States Air Force agreed to provide the crew guidance and aircraft. The filmmakers had originally intended to begin filming on March 15 in Budapest or Australia, but a 25 percent tax rebate and absence of an interest rate cap and floor made the filmmakers seek the cheaper New Mexico, because of their elevated budget. To avoid delays caused by a possible 2008 Screen Actors Guild strike in July, all exterior scenes were completed by then, so production could restart easily. The shoot ended on July 20, 2008, though some pick-ups took place in January 2009.

In addition to Bale breaking his hand and Worthington hurting his back, special effects technician Mike Meinardus almost lost his leg filming an explosion. The sequence required a manhole cover being blown into the air, which hit Menardis and partially severed his leg. McG noted it was a testament to the gritty style of the film. "I say with respect, I didn't want that Star Wars experience of everything's a blue screen, tennis balls, and go for it. I had Stan Winston build all the machines. We built all the sets, the explosive power, the explosive power so you feel that wind and that percussion and that heat blowing your eyebrows off. And with that, you get a couple bumps and bruises on the way, but you get it in an integrity and a realism that hopefully echoes Apocalypse Now. You couldn't say, 'Let's just shoot Apocalypse Now in Burbank, I think it's going to feel just as good.'"

During filming, Bale lost his temper with director of photography Shane Hurlbut for walking onto the set during an intense scene; he swore at and criticized Hurlbut before threatening to quit the film. Audio of Bale's rant leaked to the public and went viral. Bale apologized publicly and said he reconciled his differences with Hurlbut, stating that he dislikes it when takes are ruined, and that after the incident took place they continued to work together for a number of hours that day. A satirical dance remix song based on this incident titled, "Bale Out" was created by composer Lucian Piane, and various clips of Bale's voice were used in the song "Christian Bale Is At Your Party" by Rob Cantor.

The film used Technicolor's Oz process during post-production. This is a partial silver retention on the interpositive, similar to bleach bypass, which will be used to lend to the sense of detachment from the modern world McG was looking for. Industrial Light & Magic developed shader programs to make the desaturated lighting of the CGI realistic and well-integrated to the on-set footage. The filmmakers consulted with many scientists about the effects of an abandoned world and nuclear winter. McG cited Mad Max 2, the original Star Wars trilogy and Children of Men, as well as the novel The Road, as his visual influences. He instructed his cast to read the latter as well as Do Androids Dream of Electric Sheep? Like Children of Men, McG would storyboard scenes so that it would be edited together to resemble a seamless, continuous shot. It took two weeks to film a two-minute shot of Connor getting caught up in a bombing on the Skynet base where he discovers plans for the T-800.

=== Design and special effects ===
McG sought to create as many "in-camera" elements as possible to make the film more realistic. Many of the settings were hand-built, including an entire gas station for the Harvester attack scenes. The Terminator factory was built in an abandoned factory, and the design crew consulted robot manufacturer companies for a more realistic depiction. A 20-foot-tall (6.1 m) model built and detonated by Kerner Optical was used for the explosion of Skynet's 30-story San Francisco-based lab.

The majority of the machines were designed by Martin Laing, a crew member on Cameron's Titanic and Ghosts of the Abyss. McG described many of the machines as having an H. R. Giger influence. McG's intent was to create a gritty, tactile 2018 on screen, and Laing concurred the robots would have to be black and degraded as none of them are new. Laing devised Aerostats, which are smaller versions of the Aerial Hunter Killers from the previous films. The Aerostats send a signal to the 60-foot-tall (18 m) humanoid Harvesters. They are very big and slow, so they use Mototerminators to capture humans, and the Harvesters place them in Transporters. Laing was unsure of how to design the Transporters until he saw a cattle transport while driving through Albuquerque.

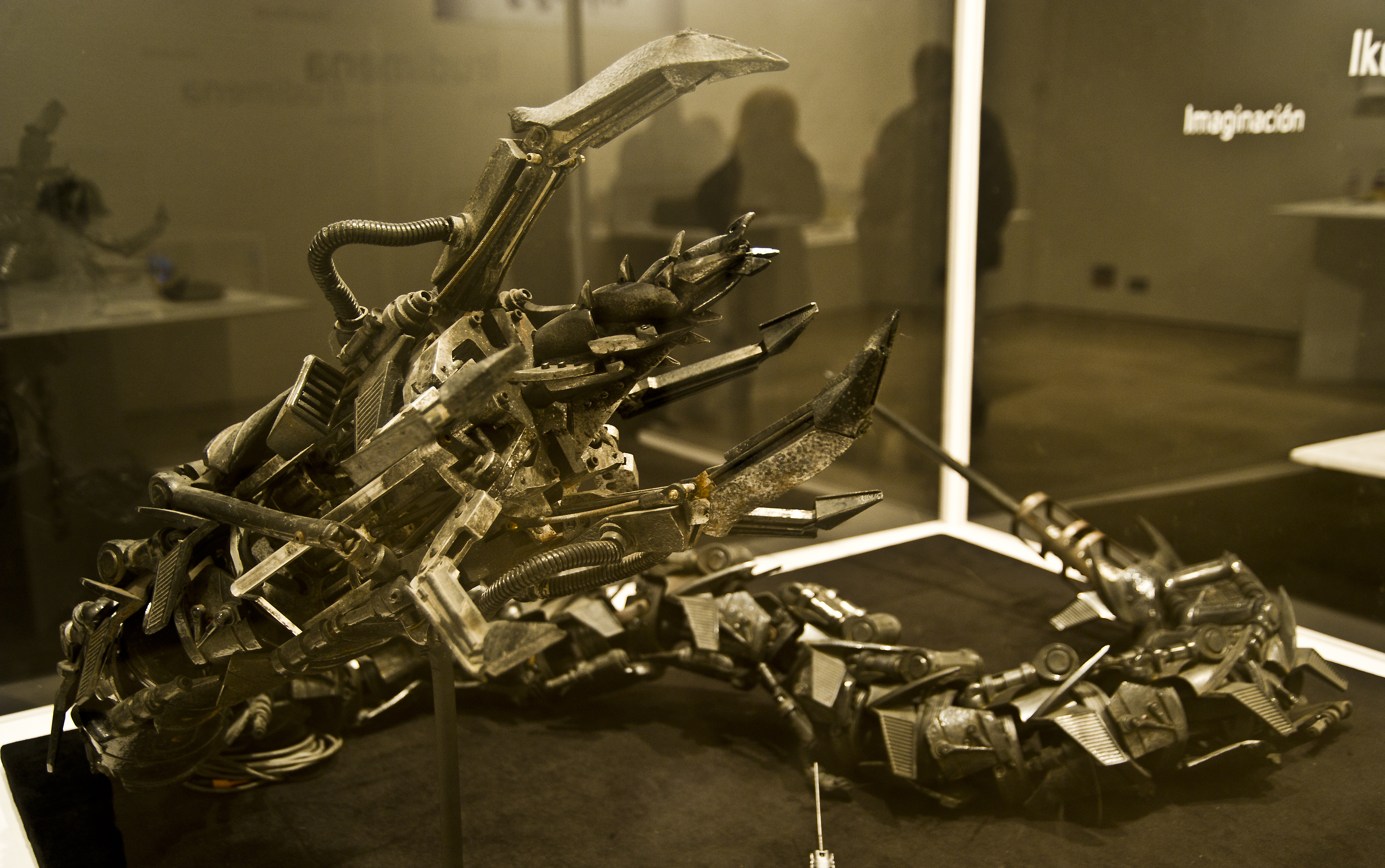
A Hydrobot from the film on display at ExpoSYFY in San Sebastián, Spain

The film features the first aquatic Skynet robot, the Hydrobot, which Laing modeled on eels, and was built by the animatronics crew with its exterior made of metal-looking rubber so it could be used in the aquatic scenes.

The film features rubber-skinned T-600 robots. McG interpreted Kyle Reese's description in the original film of the T-600 as being easy to spot by making them tall and bulky. For scenes of humans fighting with Terminators, the actors interacted with stuntmen wearing motion capture suits, later replaced by digital robots. For the Moto-Terminators, Ducati designers were hired to create the robots, and the on-screen robot was a combination of stuntmen driving actual Ducatis and a Moto-Terminator mock-up, as well as a digital Moto-Terminator. Visual effects studio Imaginary Forces created the Terminator point-of-view sequences, and tried to depict a simple interface, "free of the frills—anything that a machine would not purely need", and with more software bugs and anomalies since the robots of Salvation were not as advanced as the Terminators from the previous films.

The main special effects were done by Industrial Light & Magic. Salvation was one of the last films that Stan Winston, the visual effects supervisor on the first three films, worked on. Winston died on June 15, 2008, after a long struggle with multiple myeloma. McG dedicated the film to him in the end credits. John Rosengrant and Charlie Gibson replaced Winston, and McG commented that they are "trying to achieve something that's never been done before" and "push the envelope". Asylum Visual Effects created digital plates, Marcus' endoskeleton, and a digital T-600. Rising Sun Pictures did the digital correction of day for night scenes, the destruction of the submarine and Marcus' robot hand.

== Music ==
Danny Elfman began composing the score in January 2009. Elfman's score had a different theme but it did feature the five-note percussive sequence that had been featured in every Terminator film. Reprise Records released the 15-track soundtrack on May 19, 2009. The album featured 14 tracks of Elfman's score, along with the end credits song "Rooster" (1993) by Alice in Chains.

== Marketing ==
=== Promotion ===
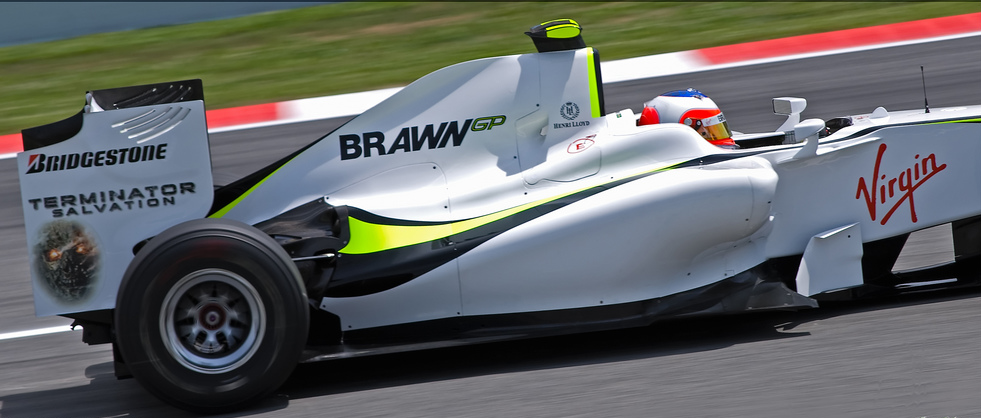
Brawn GP's Brawn BGP 001 car featured the Terminator Salvation logo during the 2009 Formula One season.

On July 16, 2008, Warner Bros. debuted the film's teaser trailer on Yahoo!, accompanied by a voiceover by Christian Bale's character of John Connor. On November 25, 2008, Sony Pictures unveiled a motion poster, showing a T-800 with the words: "Welcome to Los Angeles, 2018". In December 2008, the first theatrical trailer was released on the Apple website. In March 2009, the second trailer was released on Yahoo! Movies and was attached to Watchmen, accompanied by a remix version of Nine Inch Nails' "The Day the World Went Away". On May 8, 2009, the extended four-minute final trailer was released on Apple.

=== Tie-ins ===
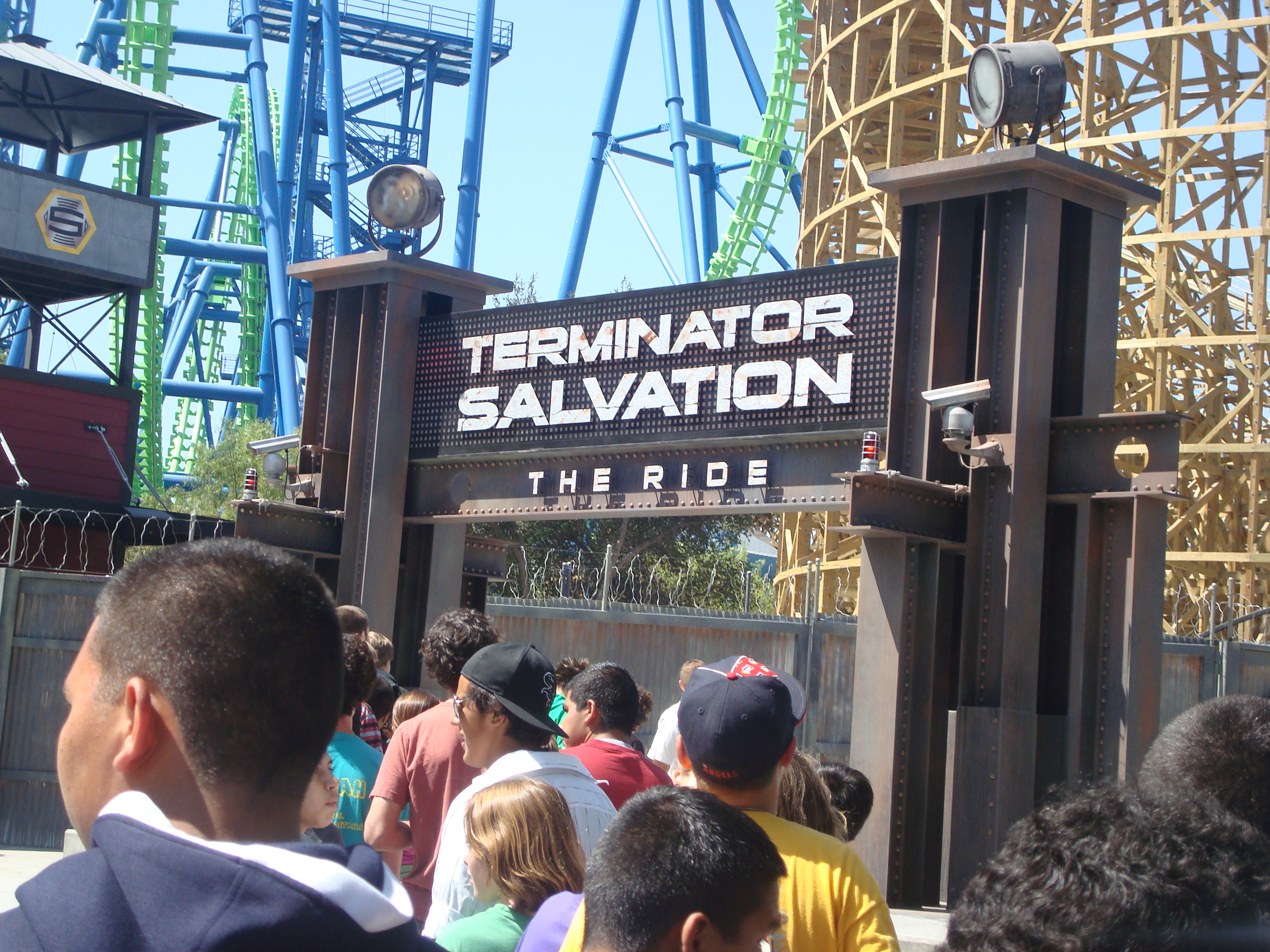
Apocalypse: The Ride at Six Flags Magic Mountain was originally named Terminator Salvation: The Ride from 2009 to 2010.

In addition to the novelization by Alan Dean Foster, a prequel novel titled Terminator Salvation: From the Ashes by Timothy Zahn was released. Two further books were inspired by the film: Cold War by Greg Cox and Trial by Fire, again by Zahn. IDW Publishing released a four-issue prequel comic, as well as an adaptation. It follows Connor rallying together the resistance in 2017, as well as examining normal people overcoming their intolerances to defeat Skynet. Dark Horse Comics released a twelve-issue sequel comic to the film, titled Terminator Salvation: The Final Battle by J. Michael Straczynski from 2013 to 2014. Playmates Toys, Sideshow Collectibles, Hot Toys, Character Options, and DC Unlimited produced merchandise, while Chrysler, Sony, Pizza Hut, and 7-Eleven were among the product placement partners. On May 23, 2009, a roller coaster named after the film opened at Six Flags Magic Mountain. In 2011, the ride was no longer licensed and renamed as Apocalypse: The Ride.

=== Video game ===
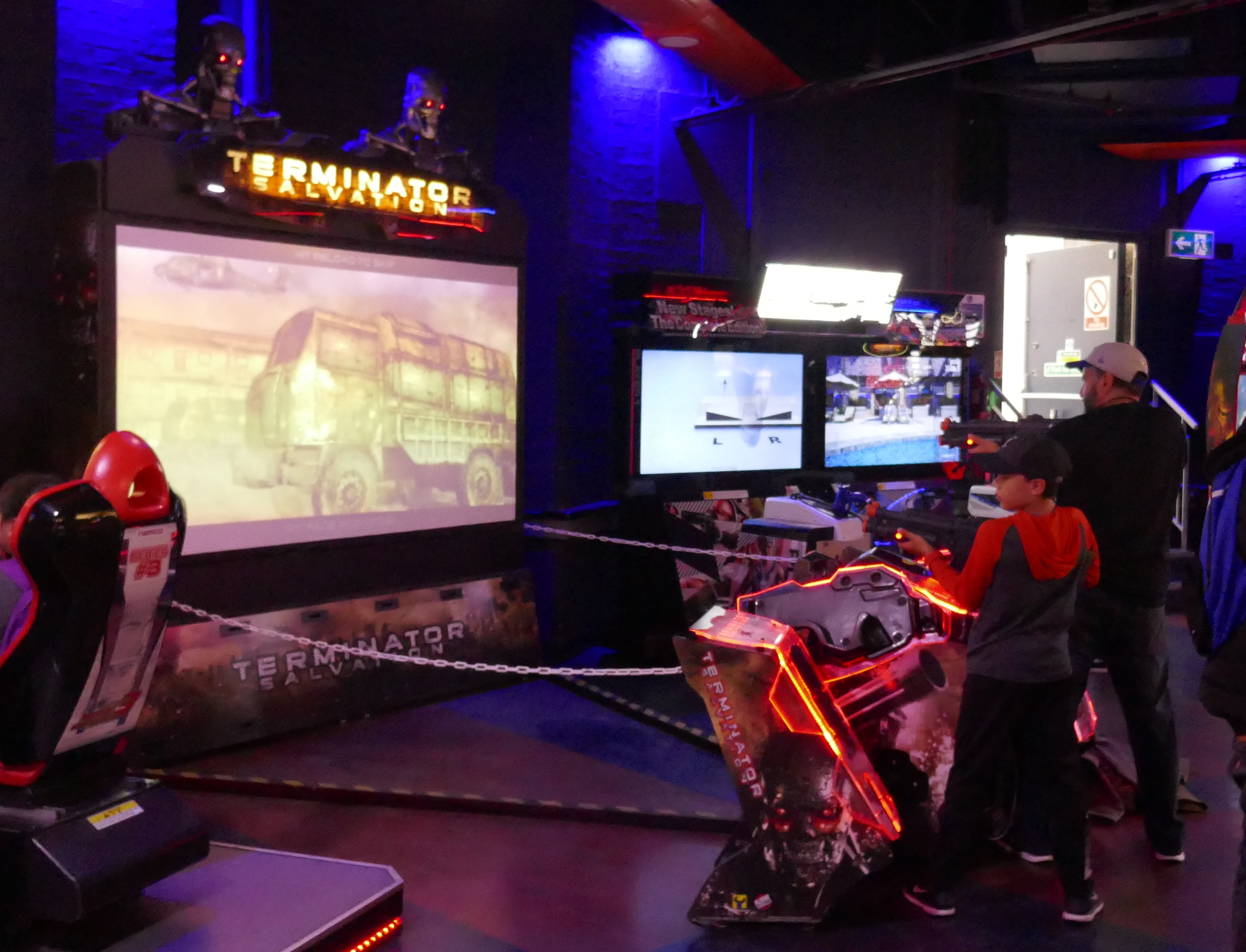
The light gun Terminator Salvation arcade game was released in 2010.

A third-person shooter video game of the same name was released on the same week of the release of the film. Christian Bale declined to lend his voice, so Gideon Emery voiced the character of John Connor. The game features the voices of Common and Moon Bloodgood as Barnes and Blair Williams, respectively. Despite not appearing in the film, Rose McGowan voiced the character of Angie Salter, an ex-high school teacher. The game is set in 2016, after the events of Terminator 3: Rise of the Machines and before the events of Terminator Salvation.

Another video game also titled Terminator Salvation was released in 2010 in arcades. It is a light gun shooter developed by Play Mechanix and published by Raw Thrills.

=== Animated series ===
On May 18, 2009, Machinima released Terminator Salvation: The Machinima Series, an animated prequel web series set before the 2009 video game, comprising six episodes. Set after Judgment Day, Blair Williams (again voiced by Bloodgood) is fighting the war against the machines in downtown Los Angeles while tracking down the computer hacker named Laz Howard (voiced by Cam Clarke) and trying to convince him to join sides with the resistance. The series was created using real-time computer animation from the video game. It was distributed by Warner Premiere, produced by Wonderland Sound and Vision and The Halcyon Company and was released on DVD on November 3, 2009.

== Release ==
=== Theatrical ===
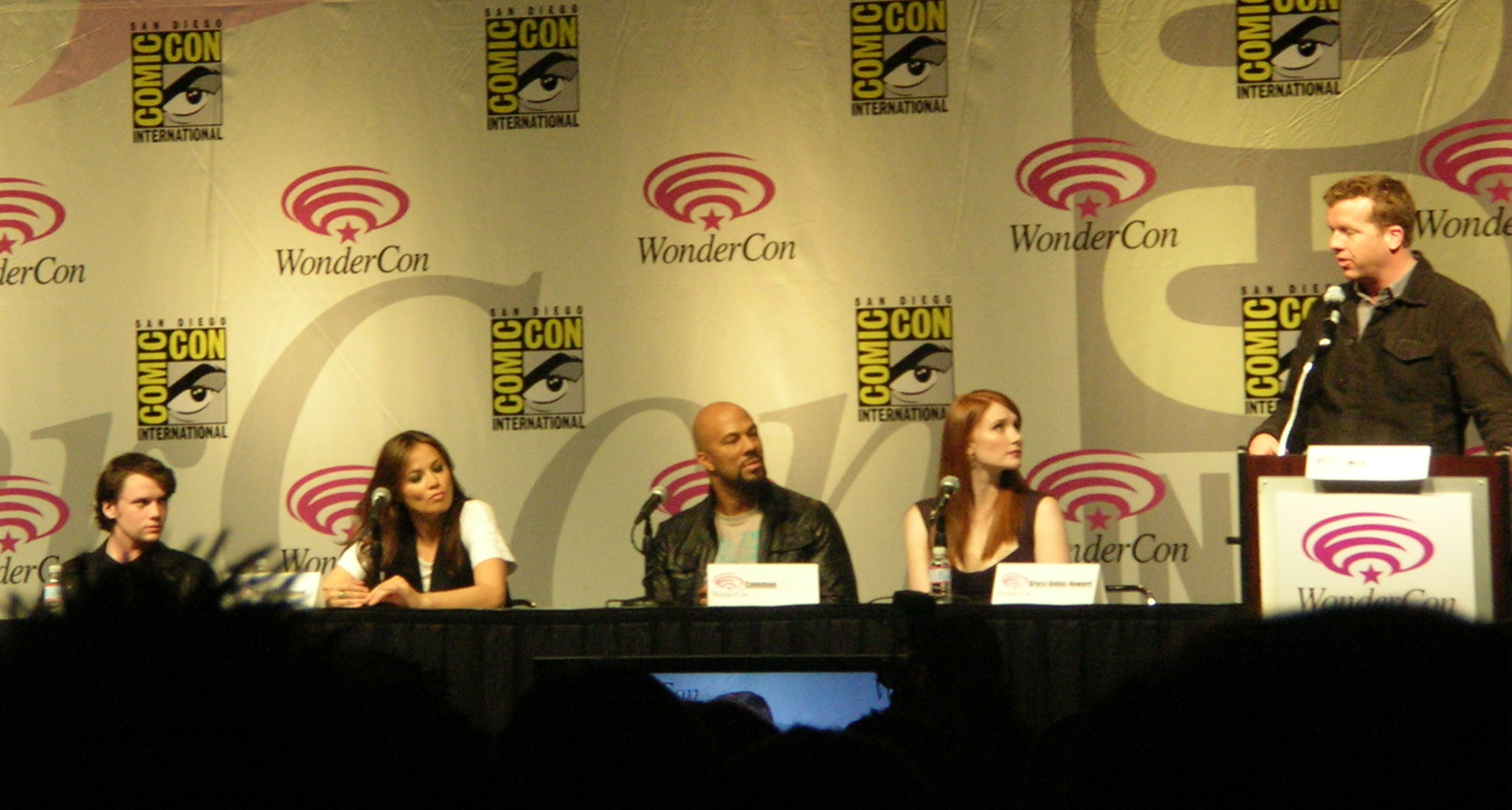
Anton Yelchin, Moon Bloodgood, Common, Bryce Dallas Howard, and director McG at the Terminator Salvation panel at WonderCon in 2009

The film was released in North America on May 21, 2009, with Warner Bros. setting the American premiere on May 14, 2009, at the Grauman's Chinese Theatre in Hollywood. Elsewhere, Sony Pictures Entertainment released the film in most overseas territories on different dates in June. One exception was Mexico, because of the swine flu outbreak in the country, which forced Sony to push the release date to July 31, 2009.

It is rated PG-13 by the Motion Picture Association of America for "intense sequences of sci-fi violence, action, and language," unlike the first three films which are rated R. The decision to release the film with a PG-13 rating was met with much criticism from fans, as well as the media. The rating decision was made after McG cut out a shot of Marcus stabbing a thug with a screwdriver, as the director felt disallowing the young audience due to that one shot was unfair. He also deleted a topless scene for Moon Bloodgood because "It was a soft moment between a man and a woman that was designed to echo the Kelly McGillis/Harrison Ford moment in Witness [but] in the end, it felt more like a gratuitous moment of a girl taking her top off in an action picture, and I didn't want that to convolute the story or the characters." In September 2020 McG again mentioned that he had a darker cut of the film that might have worked better. The producers had expected the rating because of the modern leniency toward violence in PG-13 films, such as the 2007 action film, Live Free or Die Hard.

=== Home media ===
The DVD and Blu-ray of the film was released on December 1, 2009. The DVD contains the theatrical cut of the film with a featurette on the Moto-Terminators. The Blu-ray features both the theatrical cut and the R-rated Director's Cut, which is three minutes longer (118 minutes), with bonus material including Maximum Movie Mode, a video commentary in which director McG talks about the film while it plays, featurettes, a video archive, and a digital comic of the first issue of the official film prequel comic. Both versions include a digital copy of the theatrical cut for portable media players. Target Stores was the only retailer to carry the Director's Cut on DVD. On its first week of retail, Terminator Salvation debuted at the top spot of the Blu-ray charts, and second in the DVD charts, behind Night at the Museum: Battle of the Smithsonian. The film made $29,811,432 in domestic DVD sales bringing its total gross to $401,439,971. In 2019, Sony Pictures Home Entertainment released the film on Ultra HD Blu-ray in Europe and Australia. A North American Ultra HD Blu-ray release from Warner Bros. Home Entertainment is scheduled to be released in the near future.

== Reception ==
=== Box office ===
Terminator Salvation made $3 million from its first nationwide U.S. midnight screenings and earned $13.3 million on its opening day. The film grossed $42,558,390 over the four-day Memorial Day opening weekend from 3,530 theaters, and debuted at number two behind Night at the Museum: Battle of the Smithsonian ($54.1 million). It was given a lower opening weekend than its predecessor and became the first film in the Terminator series not to open at number one. The opening also fell about 50% short of Boxoffice Magazine's pre-release projections. On its second weekend, the film dropped 61.4 per cent with $16,433,365, placing it at number three following the release of Disney-Pixar's Up.

Internationally, Terminator Salvation was more successful where it opened at number one in 66 of 70 territories during the first week of June and remained the highest-grossing film overseas the following week. In the United Kingdom, the film earned $11 million from 498 theaters and went on to gross $23.6 million. Terminator Salvation completed its theatrical run on September 10, 2009, after grossing $125,322,469 in the United States and Canada, and $246,030,532 from the international market, resulting in a worldwide total of $371,353,001. It finished as the 16th-highest-grossing film of 2009 worldwide, and the 22nd-highest-grossing film in the United States and Canada the same year. The film ranked fourth in the $300 million mark behind Star Trek, Monsters vs. Aliens, and X-Men Origins: Wolverine.

=== Critical response ===
On Rotten Tomatoes the film has an approval rating of 33% based on 279 reviews, with an average rating of 5.10/10. The website's critics consensus reads, "With storytelling as robotic as the film's iconic villains, Terminator Salvation offers plenty of great effects but lacks the heart of the original films." On Metacritic, the film has a weighted average score of 49 out of 100, based on 46 reviews, indicating "mixed or average reviews". Audiences surveyed by CinemaScore gave the film a grade B+ on scale of A to F.

Roger Ebert of the Chicago Sun-Times gave the film two out of four stars, saying that "After scrutinizing the film, I offer you my summary of the story: Guy dies, finds himself resurrected, meets others, fights. That lasts for almost two hours." Michael Rechtshaffen of The Hollywood Reporter wrote that the film isn't the same without Arnold Schwarzenegger and that it misses its dramatic element. Likewise, Claudia Puig of USA Today gave the film two out of four stars and called it "predictable" with the "dramatic elements flat-lin[ing]". She considered Christian Bale's performance "one-dimensional", but found his co-stars to "come off better", saying Sam Worthington had "a quiet intensity marred only by yelling "Nooooo!" three times in about 10 minutes" and that Anton Yelchin had "some of the best lines".

Total Film's review gave the film four out of five stars with its verdict: "The Terminator story recharges with a post-apocalyptic jolt of energy. Frantic and full of welcome ties to the past, it also ploughs new ground with purpose. Fingers crossed McG will follow Cameron's lead and serve up a worthy sequel."

Devin Faraci of Empire also gave a positive rating of four out of five stars, saying: "McG has sparked a moribund franchise back to life, giving fans the post-apocalyptic action they've been craving since they first saw a metal foot crush a human skull two decades ago." However, on CHUD, the latter said, "Bale's desire to star as John Connor was probably the most fatal blow to the film; it completely distorted the shape of the story as it existed." Furthermore, he expressed that the third act was when the film began falling apart, saying, "McG and Nolan muddied the end of the picture, delivering action generics (yet another Terminator fight in a factory) while never finding their own hook that would give this movie more of an impact than you would get from an expanded universe novel." In contrast, James Berardinelli considered the ending the best part of the film, feeling that the first two-thirds were "rambling and disjointed" and that the lack of a central villain was only fixed when the T-800 appeared.

Betsy Sharkey of the Los Angeles Times stated that "[Bale's] strengths do not serve him, or the movie, as well here" and that "when the story starts to crumble around Bale, Worthington is there to pick up the pieces". Craig Sharp of FilmShaft gave the film three out of five stars, saying "If you're looking for action then this is one damn good film! If it's character depth you're after then move along please."

A.O. Scott of The New York Times said the film has "a brute integrity lacking in some of the other seasonal franchise movies" and "efficient, reasonably swift storytelling". Ben Lyons and Ben Mankiewicz gave the film a "See It" and "Skip It", respectively, on their show At the Movies with the latter mentioning that it "is the worst big budget summer release I've seen in some time".

In Reel Power: Hollywood Cinema and American Supremacy, Matthew Alford argued that with the fourth installment, "the franchise had made a clear shift towards supporting establishment narratives, despite its earlier reservations" and that a "central theme" is whether John Connor "should prioritise striking a decisive military blow against the machines or rescue some captured humans, who are entombed—with shades of Auschwitz—by the Terminators". "[T]he flashforwards from the first three Terminator films hinted at a horrible future scape of pain, deprivation and ad-hoc guerrilla warfare", he writes, but "in contrast, producer Jeffrey Silver explained that the Department of Defense gave 'fantastic cooperation [to Salvation] because they recognized that in the future portrayed in this film, the military will still be the men and women who protect us, no matter what may come'". Alford concludes that "for a world that is set just fifteen years after a global nuclear holocaust the survivors are fancifully healthy, not to mention hairy" and that this "normalises the unthinkable".

=== Response from Terminator actors ===
Arnold Schwarzenegger, star of the preceding three films in the series, initially remarked that Terminator Salvation was "a great film, I was very excited", but later reversed this position and said it was "...awful. It tried hard, not that they didn't try, the acting and everything. It missed the boat."

Terminator series creator James Cameron considered it an "interesting film" that he "didn't hate as much as I thought I was going to" and praised Sam Worthington's performance but also said he would not return to the franchise: "[The series] has kind of run its course [...] frankly, the soup's already been pissed in by other film makers". He also felt his two films were better than either of the later films.

Linda Hamilton, who portrayed Sarah Connor in The Terminator and Terminator 2: Judgment Day and lent her voice to Terminator Salvation, wished the film "all the best" but expressed her opinion that the series "was perfect with two films. It was a complete circle, and it was enough in itself. But there will always be those who will try to milk the cow".

=== Retrospective appraisal ===
In 2020, following the critical and commercial failures of the two subsequent films, Terminator Genisys and Terminator: Dark Fate, MovieWeb reported that Terminator Salvation had developed a strong cult following, and that fans had begun petitioning for McG's R-rated director's cut to be released.

=== Accolades ===
Award	Year	Category	Result	Recipient	Ref.
Teen Choice Awards	2009	Choice Movie Actor: Action Adventure	Nominated	Christian Bale	
Teen Choice Awards	2009	Choice Movie Actress: Action Adventure	Nominated	Bryce Dallas Howard	
Teen Choice Awards	2009	Choice Movie Fresh Face Male	Nominated	Sam Worthington	
Teen Choice Awards	2009	Choice Movie: Action Adventure	Nominated	Terminator Salvation	
Teen Choice Awards	2009	Choice Summer Movie: Action Adventure	Nominated	Terminator Salvation	
Satellite Awards	2009	Best Sound (Mixing and Editing)	Nominated	Cameron Frankley; Mark Ulano; Richard Van Dyke; Ron Bartlett	
Scream Awards	2009	Best Science Fiction Movie	Nominated	Terminator Salvation	
Scream Awards	2009	Best Science Fiction Actress	Nominated	Moon Bloodgood	
Scream Awards	2009	Breakout Performance-Male	Nominated	Sam Worthington	
Scream Awards	2009	Best Cameo	Nominated	Helena Bonham Carter	
Scream Awards	2009	Best Cameo	Nominated	Arnold Schwarzenegger	
Scream Awards	2009	Best Sequel	Nominated	Terminator Salvation	
Scream Awards	2009	Best FX	Nominated	Terminator Salvation	
BMI Film & TV Awards	2010	Film Music	Won	Danny Elfman	
Taurus World Stunt Awards	2010	Best Specialty Stunt	Won	Rick Miller; Halcyon Productions	
Saturn Awards	2010	Best Makeup	Nominated	Mike Smithson; John Rosengrant	
VES Awards	2010	Best Single Visual Effect of the Year	Nominated	Chantal Feghali; Charles Gibson; Susan Greenhow; Ben Snow	
VES Awards	2010	Outstanding Models and Miniatures in a Feature Motion Picture	Nominated	Nick D'Abo; Brian Gernand; Geoff Heron; Pat Sweeney	

=== Lawsuits ===
In March 2009, producer Moritz Borman filed a lawsuit against the Halcyon Company, seeking $160 million. Borman, who had arranged the transfer of the Terminator rights to Halcyon in May 2007, claimed the company's two managers, Derek Anderson and Victor Kubicek, had "hijacked" the production and refused to give him his $2.5 million share of the production. Borman alleged budget overruns were the reasons Anderson and Kubicek did not pay him and that they had $1 million in debt. Nevertheless, an "amicable" resolution was reached a month later.

Further complications occurred on May 20, 2009, when executive producer Peter D. Graves, who informed Anderson and Kubicek about the Terminator rights, filed a breach-of-contract claim for arbitration, alleging that they owe him $750,000.

== Franchise ==
=== Canceled sequels and animated prequel ===
While Terminator Salvation was initially intended to begin a new trilogy, production of a fifth film was halted by legal trouble, as well as The Halcyon Company filing for Chapter 11 bankruptcy protection. While some anonymous sources insisted that Terminator 5 would be moving forward, the majority of analysts predicted that its future was in jeopardy.

In late September 2009, it was announced that the rights to the franchise were once again up for sale as The Halcyon Company tried to pull itself out of bankruptcy. In late October 2009, Halcyon announced it would auction off the rights to future Terminator material and was seeking $60–70 million, though the only offer made was by director Joss Whedon for $10,000. In December 2009, Halcyon issued a statement saying that they were looking at various options including sale and refinancing of the rights with an announcement on the outcome no later than February 1, 2010. On February 8, 2010, an auction was held to determine the owner of the Terminator rights. After studios Sony Pictures and Lionsgate bid separately, Pacificor, the hedge fund that pushed Halcyon into bankruptcy, made a deal for $29.5 million. Pacificor hired an agency to sell off the rights to the franchise.

In August 2010, it was reported that a new Terminator film was being developed. The new film would not be a direct sequel to Salvation, but rather an animated reboot of the original series. It would have been entitled Terminator 3000 and would be shot by Hannover House. However, Pacificor, the owner of the rights to the Terminator franchise, had not given any official license to Hannover House to develop a new film.

On February 16, 2011, it was announced that Universal Studios was considering a fifth Terminator film with Arnold Schwarzenegger returning as the star and with Fast Five's Justin Lin directing along with Chris Morgan as the screenwriter. The discussions for the film had been in the very early stages. On April 27, 2011, it was announced that a rights package to a Terminator film, to which Schwarzenegger, Lin, and producer Robert W. Cort were attached, but no screenwriter, had been circulating among the studios. Universal, Sony and Lionsgate, and CBS Films had been some of the interested companies. According to sources close to Schwarzenegger, he had only wanted to commit fully if a good script could be created.

It was reported on May 13, 2011, that Megan Ellison and her production company Annapurna Pictures won the rights to make at least two more Terminator films, including Terminator 5, in an auction deal that is rumored to have hit the $20 million mark. While Schwarzenegger was claimed to be up for a substantial role, the film would not be anchored by him; instead, a young male actor would take the lead. On December 4, 2012, a year and a half after negotiations were entered, the deal was finally closed. Ellison said that she and her brother David Ellison were "starting from scratch as they seek out a screenwriter to plot the end".

=== Reboot ===
Terminator Genisys is a reboot of the franchise, taking the premise of the original film in another direction while restarting the series from scratch. Genisys was intended to be the first of a trilogy, with Schwarzenegger reprising his role as the T-800. Genisys was released on July 1, 2015. Although the film's reception was generally negative, it was a mild box office success overseas.
