= In God We Trust (2013 film) =

- Film poster
- Directed by: Derek Anderson; Victor Kubicek
- Written by: Victor Kubicek; Derek Anderson
- Starring: Eleanor Squillari; Victor Kubicek; Bernard Madoff; Ruth Madoff; Mark Madoff; Andrew Madoff
- Release date: November 2013 (Warsaw Film Festival)
- Country: United States
- Language: English

In God We Trust is a 2013 a documentary about Eleanor Squillari, Bernard Madoff's secretary for twenty-five years and her search for the truth about Madoff's Ponzi scheme.
