= Terminator (franchise) =

Science fiction action media franchise

- Official franchise logo since 2019
- Created by: James Cameron; Gale Anne Hurd
- Original work: The Terminator (1984)
- Owner: Skydance/StudioCanal (Canal+) (Note: Skydance owns the rights just to produce new Terminator films. Other elements, such as some of the films and trademarks relating to them, are owned by other entities, including StudioCanal.)
- Years: 1984–present

Print publications
- Novels: List of novels
- Comics: List of comics

Films and television
- Film: List: The Terminator (1984); Terminator 2: Judgment Day (1991); Terminator 3: Rise of the Machines (2003); Terminator Salvation (2009); Terminator Genisys (2015); Terminator: Dark Fate (2019)
- Television series: Terminator: The Sarah Connor Chronicles (2008–2009)
- Web series: List: Terminator Salvation: The Machinima Series (2009); Terminator Genisys: The YouTube Chronicles (2015)
- Animated series: Terminator Zero (2024)

Games
- Traditional: The Terminator Collectible Card Game (2000)
- Role-playing: The Terminator RPG (2022)
- Video games: List of video games

Audio
- Soundtrack: List: The Terminator (1984); Terminator 2: Judgment Day (1991); Terminator 3: Rise of the Machines (2003); Terminator: The Sarah Connor Chronicles (2008); Terminator Salvation (2009); Terminator Genisys (2015); Terminator: Dark Fate (2019)

Miscellaneous
- Theme park attraction: List: T2-3D: Battle Across Time (1996–2020); Terminator Salvation: The Ride (2009–2010); Terminator X: A Laser Battle for Salvation (2009–2015)

Official website
- Terminator on Paramount Pictures

Terminator is an American media franchise created by James Cameron and Gale Anne Hurd. It is considered to be of the cyberpunk subgenre of science fiction. The franchise primarily focuses on the events leading to a future post-apocalyptic war between a synthetic intelligence known as Skynet, and a surviving resistance of humans led by John Connor. In this future, Skynet uses an arsenal of cyborgs known as Terminators, designed to mimic humans and infiltrate the resistance. Much of the franchise takes place in time periods prior to the Skynet takeover, with both humans and Terminators using time travel to attempt to alter the past and change the outcome of the future. A prominent Terminator model throughout the films is the T-800, commonly known as "the Terminator", with instances of this model portrayed by Arnold Schwarzenegger.

The franchise began with the 1984 film The Terminator, written and directed by Cameron, with Hurd as producer. They would return for the 1991 sequel Terminator 2: Judgment Day (or T2). Both films were critical and commercial successes. Terminator 3: Rise of the Machines (or T3) was released in 2003 to positive reviews, followed by Terminator Salvation in 2009 to more negative reviews. Salvation was intended as the first in a new trilogy, which was later scrapped after the film rights were sold.

Cameron was consulted for the 2015 film Terminator Genisys, a reboot branching off from the timeline of the original film. It was negatively received and performed poorly at the box-office. Cameron had a larger role as a producer of the 2019 film Terminator: Dark Fate, a direct sequel to T2 that ignores the three preceding films. As with Salvation, both Genisys and Dark Fate were planned as first installments of new trilogies, with the plans scrapped each time due to the films' poor box-office performances.

Outside of the theatrical films, Cameron co-directed T2-3D: Battle Across Time, a 1996 theme park film-based attraction. It was produced as the original sequel to T2 and reunited its main cast. A television series, Terminator: The Sarah Connor Chronicles, was developed without Cameron's involvement and aired for two seasons in 2008 and 2009. It was also produced as a T2 sequel, taking place in an alternate timeline that ignores the third film and subsequent events. Terminator Zero, an anime series, premiered in August 2024. The franchise has also inspired several lines of comic books since 1988, and numerous video games since 1991. By 2010, the franchise had generated $3 billion in revenue.

== Themes and setting ==
Concept art illustrating the conflicts between Skynet and the Resistance in a post-apocalyptic, futuristic setting, envisioned by creator James Cameron for the 1984 film The Terminator

The central theme of the franchise is the battle for survival between the nearly-extinct human race and the world-spanning, synthetic intelligence that is Skynet. Skynet is positioned in the first film, The Terminator (1984), as a U.S. strategic "Global Digital Defense Network" computer system by Cyberdyne Systems which becomes self-aware. Shortly after activation, Skynet seemingly perceives all humans as a threat to its existence and formulates a plan to systematically wipe out humanity itself. The system initiates a nuclear first strike against Russia, thereby ensuring a devastating second strike and a nuclear holocaust which wipes out much of humanity in the resulting nuclear war. In the post-apocalyptic aftermath, Skynet later builds up its own autonomous machine-based military capability which includes the Terminators used against individual human targets and thereafter proceeds to wage a persistent total war against the surviving elements of humanity, some of whom have militarily organized themselves into a Resistance. At some point in this future, Skynet develops the capability of time travel and both it and the Resistance seek to use this technology in order to win the war; either by altering or accelerating past events or by preventing the apocalyptic timeline.

Terminator story chronology
Original continuity
- The Terminator
- Terminator 2: Judgment Day
- Terminator 3: Rise of the Machines
- Terminator Salvation: The Machinima Series
- Terminator Salvation
Battle Across Time continuity
- The Terminator
- Terminator 2: Judgment Day
- T2-3D: Battle Across Time
The Sarah Connor Chronicles continuity
- The Terminator
- Terminator 2: Judgment Day
- Terminator: The Sarah Connor Chronicles
Genisys continuity
- Terminator Genisys
- Terminator Genisys: Future War
Dark Fate continuity
- The Terminator
- Terminator 2: Judgment Day
- Terminator: Dark Fate
Zero continuity
- The Terminator
- Terminator 2: Judgment Day
- Terminator 3: Rise of the Machines
- Terminator Salvation
- Terminator Genisys
- Terminator: Dark Fate
- Terminator Zero

=== Judgment Day ===
In the franchise, Judgment Day (a reference to the biblical Day of Judgment) is the date on which Skynet provokes the nuclear holocaust. Due to time travel and the consequent ability to change the future, several differing dates are given for Judgment Day. In Terminator 2: Judgment Day (1991), Sarah Connor states that Judgment Day will occur on August 29, 1997. However, this date is delayed following the attack on Cyberdyne Systems in the same film.

An infographic illustrating the continuity between the various timelines in the Terminator franchise

Judgment Day has various different dates in different timelines of the subsequent films, as well as the television series, creating a multiverse of temporal phenomena. In Terminator 3: Rise of the Machines (2003) and Terminator Salvation (2009), Judgment Day was postponed to July 2003. In Terminator: The Sarah Connor Chronicles (2008–2009), the attack on Cyberdyne Systems in the second film delayed Judgment Day to April 21, 2011. In Terminator Genisys (2015), the fifth film in the franchise, Judgment Day was postponed to an unspecified day in October 2017, attributed to altered events in both the future and the past. Sarah and Kyle Reese travel through time to the year 2017 and seemingly defeat Skynet, but the system core, contained inside a subterranean blast shelter, survives unknown to them, thus further delaying, rather than preventing, Judgment Day. In Terminator: Dark Fate (2019), the direct sequel to Terminator 2: Judgment Day, a date is not given for the new Judgment Day though it is named as such by Grace. Since Grace is a ten-year-old in 2020 and shown as a teenager in the post-Judgment Day world in flash-forwards throughout the film, Judgment Day occurs sometime in the early 2020s in this timeline.

== Franchise rights ==
Before the first film was created, director James Cameron sold the rights for $1 to Gale Anne Hurd, his future wife, who produced the film, under the strict provision that he be allowed to direct it. Hemdale Film Corporation also became a 50-percent owner of the franchise rights, until its share was sold in 1990 to Carolco Pictures, a company founded by Andrew G. Vajna and Mario Kassar. Terminator 2: Judgment Day was released a year later. Carolco filed for bankruptcy in 1995 and its library was subsequently acquired by StudioCanal, which continues to own the franchise today. However, the rights to future Terminator films were ultimately put up for auction. By that time, Cameron had become interested in making a Terminator 3 film. The rights were ultimately auctioned to Vajna in 1997, for $8 million. Vajna and Kassar spent another $8 million to purchase Hurd's half of the rights in 1998, becoming the full owners of the franchise. Hurd, who was no longer married to Cameron at that point, was initially opposed to the sale of the rights, while Cameron had lost interest in the franchise and a third film.

After the 2003 release of Terminator 3: Rise of the Machines, the franchise rights were sold in 2007 for about $25 million to The Halcyon Company, which produced Terminator Salvation in 2009. Later that year, the company faced legal issues and filed for bankruptcy, putting the franchise rights up for sale. The rights were valued at about $70 million. In 2010, the rights were sold for $29.5 million to Pacificor, a hedge fund that was Halcyon's largest creditor. In 2012, the rights were sold to Megan Ellison and her production company Annapurna Pictures for less than $20 million, a lower price than what was previously offered. The low price was because of the possibility of Cameron regaining the rights in 2019, as a result of new North American copyright laws. Megan's brother David Ellison and Skydance Productions produced Terminator Genisys in 2015.

Cameron worked together with David Ellison to produce the 2019 film Terminator: Dark Fate. As the film neared its release, Hurd filed to terminate a copyright grant made 35 years earlier. Under this move, Hurd would again become a 50-percent owner of the rights with Cameron and Skydance could lose the rights to make any additional Terminator films beginning in November 2020, unless a new deal is worked out. Skydance responded that it had a deal in place with Cameron and that it "controls the rights to the Terminator franchise for the foreseeable future".

== Films ==
| Film | U.S. release date | Director | Screenwriters | Story by | Producer(s) |
|---|---|---|---|---|---|
| The Terminator | October 26, 1984 | James Cameron | James Cameron and Gale Anne Hurd | James Cameron and Gale Anne Hurd | Gale Anne Hurd |
| Terminator 2: Judgment Day | July 3, 1991 | James Cameron | James Cameron & William Wisher Jr. | James Cameron & William Wisher Jr. | James Cameron |
| Terminator 3: Rise of the Machines | July 2, 2003 | Jonathan Mostow | John Brancato and Michael Ferris | John Brancato & Michael Ferris and Tedi Sarafian | Colin Wilson, Mario Kassar, Hal Lieberman, Andrew G. Vajna and Joel B. Michaels |
| Terminator Salvation | May 21, 2009 | McG | John Brancato & Michael Ferris | John Brancato & Michael Ferris | Moritz Borman, Derek Anderson, Victor Kubicek and Jeffrey Silver |
| Terminator Genisys | July 1, 2015 | Alan Taylor | Laeta Kalogridis & Patrick Lussier | Laeta Kalogridis & Patrick Lussier | Dana Goldberg and David Ellison |
| Terminator: Dark Fate | November 1, 2019 | Tim Miller | David Goyer & Justin Rhodes and Billy Ray | James Cameron & Charles Eglee & Josh Friedman & David Goyer & Justin Rhodes | James Cameron and David Ellison |

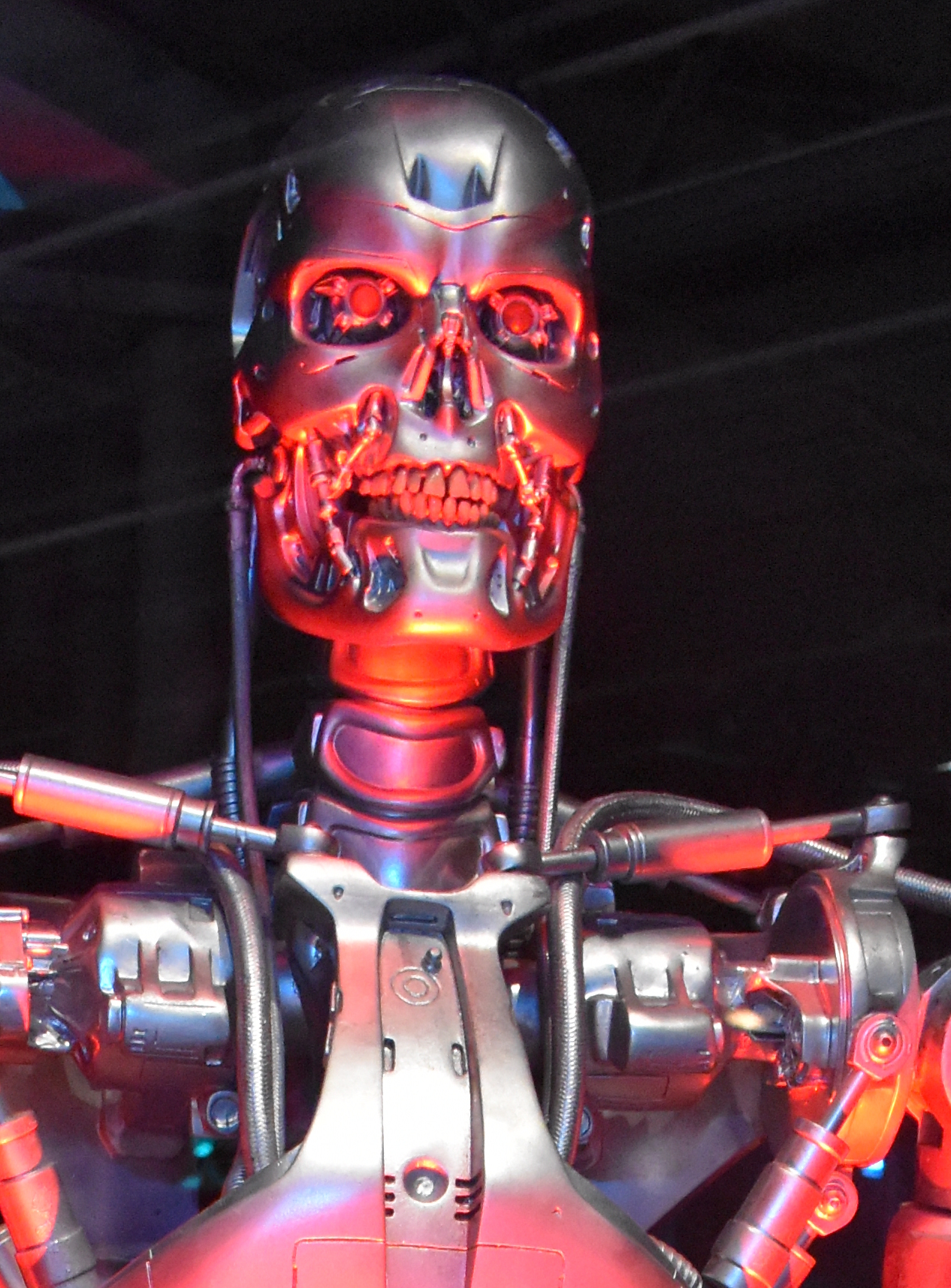
A Terminator endoskeleton

=== The Terminator (1984) ===
The Terminator is a 1984 science fiction action film released by Orion Pictures, co-written and directed by James Cameron and starring Arnold Schwarzenegger, Linda Hamilton and Michael Biehn. It is the first work in the Terminator franchise. In the film, robots take over the world in the near future, directed by the artificial intelligence Skynet. With its sole mission to completely annihilate humanity, it develops android assassins called Terminators that outwardly appear human. A man named John Connor starts the Tech-Com resistance to fight the machines, defeat Skynet and free humanity. With a human victory imminent, the machines' only choice is to send a Terminator back in time to kill John's mother, Sarah Connor and prevent the boy's birth, thereby stopping the resistance from being founded in the first place. With the fate of humanity at stake, John sends soldier Kyle Reese back to protect Sarah Connor and thus ensure his own existence. It was released on October 26, 1984 and grossed $78.4 million worldwide.

=== Terminator 2: Judgment Day (1991) ===
Terminator 2: Judgment Day is the 1991 sequel to the original Terminator film and was released by TriStar Pictures. It was co-written, directed and produced by James Cameron and stars Arnold Schwarzenegger, Linda Hamilton, Edward Furlong, Robert Patrick and Joe Morton. After robots fail to prevent John Connor from being born, they try again in 1995, this time attempting to terminate him as a child by using a more advanced Terminator, the T-1000. As before, John sends back a protector for his younger self, a reprogrammed Terminator, who is a doppelgänger to the one from 1984. After years of preparing for the future war, Sarah decides to use the same tactics the robots used on her: preventing Skynet from being invented by destroying Cyberdyne Systems before they create it.

Terminator 2: Judgment Day was released on July 3, 1991 to critical acclaim, becoming the most successful film at the US box office in 1991, and grossing $523.7 million worldwide. It won several Academy Awards, one most notably for its groundbreaking computer animation. The film was remastered for 3D and re-released in August 2017.

=== Terminator 3: Rise of the Machines (2003) ===
Terminator 3: Rise of the Machines, released by Warner Bros. Pictures in North America and Columbia TriStar Film Distributors internationally, is the 2003 sequel to Terminator 2 and is written by John Brancato, Michael Ferris, directed by Jonathan Mostow and starring Arnold Schwarzenegger, Nick Stahl, Claire Danes and Kristanna Loken. As a result of the destruction of Cyberdyne, the Skynet takeover has been postponed, not averted. In an attempt to ensure a victory by the robots, a new Terminator, the T-X, is sent back to terminate as many of John Connor's future lieutenants as possible, including his future wife Kate Brewster and also John himself. Kate's father, General Robert Brewster (David Andrews), who is supervising Skynet's development, is also targeted for termination by the T-X. After Connor's future self is terminated by a doppelgänger of his previous protector, Kate reprograms him and sends him back to save them both from the T-X. It was released on July 2, 2003 to generally favorable reviews and grossed $433.4 million worldwide.

=== Terminator Salvation (2009) ===
Terminator Salvation is the fourth installment of the Terminator film series, produced by The Halcyon Company and distributed by Warner Bros. Pictures and Columbia Pictures. It was released on May 21, 2009 to negative reviews and grossed $371.4 million. It was written by John Brancato and Michael Ferris, directed by McG, and stars Christian Bale as John Connor and Sam Worthington (who was personally recommended by James Cameron) as Marcus Wright. Following the events of Terminator 3: Rise of the Machines, after Skynet has destroyed much of humanity in a nuclear holocaust, John struggles to fulfill his destiny as the leader of humanity, while Marcus Wright finds his place in an unfamiliar post-apocalyptic world. In this future, the T-800 Terminators (Roland Kickinger with CG-rendered facial likeness of Arnold Schwarzenegger) are coming online sooner than expected. The film also stars Anton Yelchin as Kyle Reese, Bryce Dallas Howard, Moon Bloodgood, Common, Michael Ironside, and Helena Bonham Carter.

=== Terminator Genisys (2015) ===
Terminator Genisys is the fifth installment of the franchise and also serves as a reboot. It features the main characters from the first two films portrayed by a new cast, with the exception of Arnold Schwarzenegger reprising his role as the eponymous character. Additionally, J. K. Simmons joined the cast as Detective O'Brien, serving as an ally for the film's protagonists. The film was written by Laeta Kalogridis and Patrick Lussier and directed by Alan Taylor. It was made by Skydance Productions and distributed by Paramount Pictures. The story takes place in an alternate reality resulting from a chain of events related to Skynet's (Matt Smith) actions throughout a previous timeline. Prior to this alteration, on the verge of winning the war against Skynet, John Connor (Jason Clarke) sends his trusted right-hand officer Kyle Reese (Jai Courtney) back through time to save his mother's life and ensure his own existence. However, Kyle arrives at an alternate timeline where Skynet had never launched its initial attack in 1997 and Sarah Connor (Emilia Clarke) was brought up by a reprogrammed Terminator (Schwarzenegger), sent by an unknown party to be her guardian ever since childhood. Now Sarah, Kyle and the Guardian need to escape the T-800 Model 101 (Brett Azar with CG-rendered likeness of Schwarzenegger from the first film), the T-1000 (Lee Byung-hun) and Skynet's T-3000, in an attempt to stop Judgment Day from ever happening; while trying to uncover the secrets behind Cyberdyne Systems' new application software: Genisys. Assisting the trio is O'Brien, whose investigation into time travelers (especially Terminators) leads him to learn about Skynet and helps the protagonists in their mission to avert Judgment Day.

Cameron was consulted for the film during its early development. It was released in the U.S. on July 1, 2015 and grossed $440.6 million worldwide. Its commercial performance was lower than anticipated, resulting in two planned sequels and a spin-off television series being cancelled in favor of Terminator: Dark Fate (2019).

=== Terminator: Dark Fate (2019) ===
Terminator: Dark Fate is the sixth installment of the franchise and a direct sequel to Terminator 2: Judgment Day. It is directed by Tim Miller and was released in the U.S. on November 1, 2019. It stars Linda Hamilton and Arnold Schwarzenegger, reprising their roles as Sarah Connor and the Terminator, respectively. The film also stars Mackenzie Davis, Natalia Reyes and Gabriel Luna. Jude Collie and Brett Azar were also cast as a young John Connor and a younger T-800, respectively.

The previous film, Terminator Genisys, had been intended as the first in a new stand-alone film trilogy, but the planned sequels were canceled following the film's disappointing box-office performance. The producer of that film, David Ellison, recruited James Cameron to produce a new film with him, which would become Terminator: Dark Fate.

In the film, the machines send a Terminator, Rev-9 (Luna), back in time to eliminate Dani Ramos (Reyes), whose destiny is linked to the Human Resistance's war against them. The Resistance sends one of their soldiers, Grace (Davis), back to protect her, and a chain of events leads Grace and Dani to join forces with Sarah Connor and the T-800.

The writers' room included Josh Friedman, creator of the television series Terminator: The Sarah Connor Chronicles. Other writers included David S. Goyer, Justin Rhodes and Billy Ray. The creative team stated that the new film would feature a young 18- to 21-year-old, who could potentially lead the franchise should the first film be successful. Miller made mention of creating a theme park attraction akin to T2 3-D: Battle Across Time should the film prove successful. Because the series deals with time-travel, the film ignores the premise of the last three films and the TV series and is not titled Terminator 6, as it is also a direct sequel to Terminator 2: Judgment Day. Filming began in Isleta del Moro, Almería on June 4, 2018, shooting for a month there, before shooting the rest in the United States.

This film was intended to be the first in a new trilogy of Terminator films, but these plans were canceled due to mixed audience reactions and underperformance at the box office.

=== Future ===
In December 2022, while promoting Avatar: The Way of Water, producer and director of the first two Terminator films James Cameron revealed that another series reboot was "in discussion, but nothing has been decided". The reboot would likely feature an entirely new cast and reset the continuity of the entire film series. Cameron suggested that in hindsight, bringing back both Arnold Schwarzenegger and Linda Hamilton for Terminator: Dark Fate had been a mistake. In May 2023, Schwarzenegger stated in an interview that he would not appear in any future franchise installments after the last few films were "not well-written". Later that month, it was reported that Cameron was developing a script for a Terminator reboot.

In February 2024, Hamilton stated in an interview that she would also not appear in any more future installments feeling that she did all she could in the franchise and thought the story had been "done to death". She also questioned the idea of rebooting the franchise again stating "Why anybody would relaunch it is a mystery to me." In September 2024, Cameron confirmed that he was working on more films, in which the core themes are kept but the "distinct iconography" of the previous films is to be discarded. In September 2025, he confirmed he was still working on writing a new movie, but that he was struggling to come up with a story, stating that "I've been unable to get started on that very far because I don't know what to say that won't be overtaken by real events. We are living in a science fiction age right now." Following the release of Avatar: Fire and Ash, Cameron stated he was still working on a new film, with his intent to focus on it in a couple of months after the release of Avatar: Fire and Ash, and reiterated that it will be the first he is involved with that will not feature Schwarzenegger. Cameron stated that "there needs to be a broader interpretation of Terminator and the idea of a time war and super intelligence. I want to do new stuff that people aren't imagining."

== Television ==
| Series | Season | Episodes | First released | Last released | Showrunner | Network |
|---|---|---|---|---|---|---|
| Terminator: The Sarah Connor Chronicles | 1 | 9 | January 13, 2008 | March 3, 2008 | Josh Friedman | Fox |
| Terminator: The Sarah Connor Chronicles | 2 | 22 | September 8, 2008 | April 10, 2009 | Josh Friedman | Fox |
| Terminator Zero | 1 | 8 | August 29, 2024 | | Mattson Tomlin | Netflix |

=== Terminator: The Sarah Connor Chronicles (2008–2009) ===
Terminator: The Sarah Connor Chronicles follows Sarah (Lena Headey) and John Connor (Thomas Dekker) as they try to "live under the radar" after destroying Cyberdyne in Terminator 2. Summer Glau plays a Terminator named Cameron and Brian Austin Green plays Derek Reese, the brother of Kyle Reese, both sent back in time to protect the Connors and prevent another Judgment Day.

=== Terminator Zero (2024) ===
Terminator Zero is an anime series released on Netflix on August 29, 2024, notably referencing Judgment Day from the films. It is a co-production between Skydance and Production I.G. Unlike previous installments, the eight-episode series takes place in Japan without any ties to Sarah Connor or her son, John, instead focusing on new characters.

== Web series ==
| Series | Season | Episodes | First released | Last released | Showrunner | Network |
|---|---|---|---|---|---|---|
| Terminator Salvation: The Machinima Series | 1 | 6 | May 18, 2009 | June 24, 2009 | Andy Shapiro | Machinima |
| Terminator Genisys: The YouTube Chronicles | 1 | 3 | June 22, 2015 | | Jay Bushman | YouTube |

=== Terminator Salvation: The Machinima Series (2009) ===
Set in 2016, years after Judgment Day, Blair Williams (voiced by Moon Bloodgood) is fighting the war against the machines in downtown Los Angeles, while tracking down the computer hacker named Laz Howard (voiced by Cam Clarke) and trying to persuade him to join sides with the resistance.

=== Terminator Genisys: The YouTube Chronicles (2015) ===
Terminator Genisys: The YouTube Chronicles was released in three parts on June 22, 2015 to promote the fifth film, produced by Heresy. The web series was directed by Charles Paek and written by Jay Bushman. It features several popular YouTube stars appearing with Arnold Schwarzenegger as the T-800, as they stand together against the T-360 (played by fellow YouTube personality, Toby Turner).

== Cast and crew ==
=== Principal cast ===
List indicators

This section includes characters who will appear or have appeared in the franchise.

- An empty grey cell indicates the character was not in the film, or that the character's official presence has not yet been confirmed.
- ^{A} indicates an appearance through archival footage or audio.
- ^{E} indicates an appearance not included in the theatrical cut.
- ^{O} indicates an older version of the character.
- ^{P} indicates an appearance in onscreen photographs.
- ^{S} indicates an appearance through use of special effects.
- ^{U} indicates an uncredited appearance.
- ^{V} indicates a voice-only role.
- ^{Y} indicates a younger version of the character.
- ^{M} indicates a model with the actor or actress's likeness served as a body double.
- ^{L} indicates the actor or actress lent only their likeness for the film.

| Characters | Films | | | | | | Attraction | Television series | |
| Characters | The Terminator | Terminator 2: Judgment Day | Terminator 3: Rise of the Machines | Terminator Salvation | Terminator Genisys | Terminator: Dark Fate | T2-3D: Battle Across Time | Terminator: The Sarah Connor Chronicles | |
| Characters | The Terminator | Terminator 2: Judgment Day | Terminator 3: Rise of the Machines | Terminator Salvation | Terminator Genisys | Terminator: Dark Fate | T2-3D: Battle Across Time | Season 1 | Season 2 |
| Characters | 1984 | 1991 | 2003 | 2009 | 2015 | 2019 | 1996 | 2008–2009 | |
Machines
| Terminator T-800 Model 101 (Note: In the first three films, the characters portrayed by Arnold Schwarzenegger are each credited as Terminator. In Terminator 2: Judgment Day, the character briefly uses the alias of Uncle Bob on the behest of John Connor. In Terminator 3: Rise of the Machines, the character refers to itself as a T-101 and is referred to in promotional materials as a T-850. In Terminator Genisys, the character is referred to as Pops and credited as Guardian. In Terminator: Dark Fate, the character goes by the name Carl.) | Arnold Schwarzenegger | Arnold Schwarzenegger | Arnold Schwarzenegger | Arnold Schwarzenegger^{L}^{S} (Note: Arnold Schwarzenegger's facial likeness was utilized via CGI, applied to Kickinger's body performance. The CGI model was made from a mold of his face made in 1984, scanned to create the digital makeup.) Roland Kickinger^{Y}^{M} | Arnold Schwarzenegger Brett Azar^{Y}^{M} | Arnold Schwarzenegger Brett Azar^{Y}^{M} | Arnold Schwarzenegger | Mentioned | Mentioned |
| T-1000 | | Robert Patrick | | | Lee Byung-hun | | Robert Patrick | | Mentioned |
| T-X | | | Kristanna Loken | | | | | | |
| Skynet Dr. Serena Kogan Alex (Note: In Terminator Salvation, Skynet appears on a computer screen using the physical appearance of Dr. Serena Kogan (portrayed by Helena Bonham Carter). In Terminator Genisys, Skynet makes a physical appearance under the disguise of a resistance soldier who is credited as Alex (portrayed by Matt Smith). In the latter film, Skynet, now known as Genisys, makes additional appearances as a holographic human male ranging in age from 10 to 18 years old, and aged again into another form also portrayed by Smith.) | Mentioned | Mentioned | Mentioned | Helena Bonham Carter | Matt Smith Ian Etheridge^{Y} Seth Meriwether^{Y} Nolan Gross^{Y} | Mentioned | No physical actor, network facility only | No physical actor, network facility only | No physical actor, network facility only |
| Marcus Wright Cyborg | | | | Sam Worthington | | | | | |
| T-600 | Mentioned | | | Brian Steele | | | | Chris Gann | Chris Gann |
| T-3000 | | | | | Jason Clarke | | | | |
| Grace Harper Augment | | | | | | Mackenzie Davis Stephanie Gil^{Y} | | | |
| Rev-9 | | | | | | Gabriel Luna | | | |
| Cameron | | | | | | | | Summer Glau | Summer Glau |
| Cromartie / John Henry T-888 | | | | | | | | Owain Yeoman Garret Dillahunt | Garret Dillahunt |
| Catherine Weaver T-1001 | | | | | | | | | Shirley Manson |
Humans
| Sarah Connor | Linda Hamilton | Linda Hamilton Leslie Hamilton^{M} | Mentioned | Linda Hamilton^{U}^{V} | Emilia Clarke Willa Taylor^{Y} | Linda Hamilton Maddy Curley^{Y}^{M} | Linda Hamilton | Lena Headey | Lena Headey |
| Kyle Reese | Michael Biehn | Michael Biehn^{U}^{E} (Note: Michael Biehn reprised his role as Kyle Reese in a cameo scene in which he visits Sarah in a dream of hers. His scene was cut from the theatrical release, but was later restored when the film was re-released in 1993 and 1997 under the name Terminator 2: Judgment Day – Special Edition.) | | Anton Yelchin | Jai Courtney Bryant Prince^{Y} | Mentioned | | Jonathan Jackson Skyler Gisondo^{Y} | Jonathan Jackson |
| Dr. Peter Silberman | Earl Boen | Earl Boen | Earl Boen | | | Earl Boen^{A} | | Bruce Davison | Mentioned |
| Lieutenant Ed Traxler | Paul Winfield | | | | | | | | |
| Vukovich | Lance Henriksen | | | | | | | | |
| John Connor | Mentioned | Edward Furlong Michael Edwards^{O} Dalton Abbott^{Y} | Nick Stahl | Christian Bale | Jason Clarke | Edward Furlong^{L}^{S} Jude Collie^{Y}^{M} Aaron Kunitz^{V} | Edward Furlong | Thomas Dekker John DeVito^{Y} | Thomas Dekker John DeVito^{Y} |
| Miles Dyson | | Joe Morton | | | Courtney Vance | | | Phil Morris^{P} | Mentioned |
| Danny Dyson | | DeVaughn Nixon | | | Dayo Okeniyi | | | Shawn Prince | Mentioned |
| Tarissa Dyson | | S. Epatha Merkerson | | | | | | Charlayne Woodard | |
| Enrique Salceda | | Castulo Guerra | | | | | | Tony Amendola | |
| Katherine "Kate" Connor (née Brewster) | | | Claire Danes | Bryce Dallas Howard | | | | | |
| Robert Brewster | | | David Andrews | | | | | | |
| Scott | | | Mark Famiglietti | | | | | | |
| Blair Williams | | | | Moon Bloodgood | | | | | |
| Lieutenant Barnes | | | | Common | | | | | |
| General Ashdown | | | | Michael Ironside | | | | | |
| Dr. Serena Kogan | | | | Helena Bonham Carter | | | | | |
| Star | | | | Jadagrace Berry | | | | | |
| Detective O'Brien | | | | | J. K. Simmons Wayne Bastrup^{Y} | | | | |
| Lieutenant Matias | | | | | Michael Gladis | | | | |
| Detective Cheung | | | | | Sandrine Holt | | | | |
| Daniella "Dani" Ramos | | | | | | Natalia Reyes | | | |
| Diego Ramos | | | | | | Diego Boneta | | | |
| Felipe Gandal | | | | | | Tristán Ulloa | | | |
| Major Dean | | | | | | Fraser James | | | |
| Derek Reese | | | | | | | | Brian Austin Green | Brian Austin Green |
| James Ellison | | | | | | | | Richard T. Jones | Richard T. Jones |
| Charley Dixon | | | | | | | | Dean Winters | Dean Winters |
| Allison Young | | | | | | | | | Summer Glau |
| Jesse Flores | | | | | | | | | Stephanie Jacobsen |
| Riley Dawson | | | | | | | | | Leven Rambin |

=== Additional crew ===
| Crew | Film | | | | | |
| Crew | The Terminator | Terminator 2: Judgment Day | Terminator 3: Rise of the Machines | Terminator Salvation | Terminator Genisys | Terminator: Dark Fate |
| Crew | 1984 | 1991 | 2003 | 2009 | 2015 | 2019 |
|---|---|---|---|---|---|---|
| Executive Producers | John Daly, Derek Gibson | Gale Ann Hurd, Mario Kassar | Moritz Borman, Guy East, Nigel Sinclair, Gale Ann Hurd | Peter Graves, Bahman Naraghi, Mario Kassar, Andrew G. Vajna, Joel Michaels, Dan Lin, Jeanne Allgood. | Bill Carraro, Robert Cort, Megan Ellison, Laeta Kalogridis, Patrick Lussier | Dana Goldberg, Don Granger, Edward Cheng, Tim Miller, John Kelly, Bonnie Curtis, Julie Lynn |
| Composer | Brad Fiedel | Brad Fiedel | Marco Beltrami | Danny Elfman | Lorne Balfe | Tom Holkenborg |
| Cinematography | Adam Greenberg | Adam Greenberg | Don Burgess | Shane Hurlbut | Kramer Morgenthau | Ken Seng |
| Editor | Mark Goldblatt | Conrad Buff IV; Mark Goldblatt; Richard A. Harris | Nicolas De Toth; Neil Travis | Conrad Buff | Roger Barton | Julian Clarke |
| Production companies | Hemdale Film Corporation; Pacific Western Productions; Cinema '84 | Carolco Pictures; Pacific Western Productions; Lightstorm Entertainment; Le Studio Canal+ | Intermedia; IMF; C2 Pictures; Mostow/Lieberman Productions | The Halcyon Company; Wonderland Sound and Vision | Skydance Productions | Paramount Pictures; Skydance Media; 20th Century Fox; Tencent Pictures; Lightstorm Entertainment |
| Distributor | Orion Pictures | Tri-Star Pictures | Warner Bros. Pictures; Columbia TriStar Film Distributors International | Warner Bros. Pictures; Sony Pictures Releasing International | Paramount Pictures | Paramount Pictures; Buena Vista International |

== Reception ==
=== Box office performance ===
| Film | U.S. release date | Box office revenue | | | Box office ranking | | Budget | Ref(s) |
| Film | U.S. release date | North America | International | Worldwide | North America | Worldwide | Budget | Ref(s) |
|---|---|---|---|---|---|---|---|---|
| The Terminator | October 26, 1984 | $38,371,200 | $40,000,000 | $78,371,200 | #1,917 | | $6.4 million | |
| Terminator 2: Judgment Day | July 3, 1991 | $205,881,154 | $312,106,698 | $517,987,852 | #152 (#106)^{(A)} | #136 | $94–102 million | |
| Terminator 3: Rise of the Machines | July 2, 2003 | $150,371,112 | $283,000,000 | $433,371,112 | #288 | #188 | $170–$187.3 million | |
| Terminator Salvation | May 21, 2009 | $125,322,469 | $246,030,532 | $371,353,001 | #418 | #242 | $200 million | |
| Terminator Genisys | July 1, 2015 | $89,760,956 | $350,842,581 | $440,603,537 | #706 | #186 | $155–158 million | |
| Terminator: Dark Fate | November 1, 2019 | $62,253,077 | $198,866,215 | $261,119,292 | #1,368 | #602 | $185–196 million | |
| Total | | $671,959,968 | $1,430,846,026 | $2,102,805,994 | #30 | #27 | $810.4–832.4 million | |
List indicators: A dark gray cell indicates the information is not available for the film.^{(A)} indicates the adjusted totals based on current ticket prices (calculated by Box Office Mojo).

=== Critical and public response ===
| Film | Rotten Tomatoes | Metacritic | CinemaScore |
|---|---|---|---|
| The Terminator | 90% (132 reviews) | 84 (21 reviews) | B+ |
| Terminator 2: Judgment Day | 90% (155 reviews) | 75 (22 reviews) | A+ |
| Terminator 3: Rise of the Machines | 70% (203 reviews) | 66 (41 reviews) | B+ |
| Terminator Salvation | 33% (279 reviews) | 49 (46 reviews) | B+ |
| Terminator Genisys | 26% (276 reviews) | 38 (41 reviews) | B+ |
| Terminator: Dark Fate | 70% (351 reviews) | 54 (51 reviews) | B+ |

| Television | Rotten Tomatoes | Metacritic |
|---|---|---|
| Terminator: The Sarah Connor Chronicles (season 1) | 76% (6.95/10 average rating) (34 reviews) | 74 (24 reviews) |
| Terminator: The Sarah Connor Chronicles (season 2) | 93% (7.40/10 average rating) (15 reviews) | 67 (4 reviews) |

| Web series | Rotten Tomatoes | Metacritic |
|---|---|---|
| Terminator Zero | 87% (30 reviews) | 69 (11 reviews) |

=== Cultural impact ===
The Terminator franchise, most notably James Cameron's original films, The Terminator and Terminator 2: Judgment Day, has had a significant impact on popular culture. The film franchise placed #17 on the top 25 greatest film franchises by IGN and is also in the top 30 highest-grossing franchises. According to Rotten Tomatoes, the Terminator franchise is the sixth highest rated franchise on the site behind the Toy Story franchise, the Dollars Trilogy, The Lord of the Rings film trilogy, the Mad Max franchise and the original Star Wars trilogy, but in front of the Indiana Jones franchise.

In 2008, The Terminator was selected for preservation in the National Film Registry by the Library of Congress as being "culturally, historically or aesthetically significant". The American Film Institute (AFI) has also recognized both films on a number of occasions: the line "I'll be back" from The Terminator placed as the 37th-best movie quote, while "Hasta la vista, baby" from Terminator 2 ranked 76th on the same list. The Terminator character from The Terminator was voted the 22nd-greatest villain; meanwhile, the T-800 (of the same likeness) in Terminator 2: Judgment Day was voted the 48th-greatest hero; this is the only time the same character has appeared on the two opposing lists. In the 100 Years...100 series list, the Terminator franchise was voted the 42nd most thrilling. In addition, Terminator 2: Judgment Day ranked 8th on AFI's top 10 list in the science fiction genre. In 2023, Terminator 2: Judgment Day was also selected for preservation.

Both films are the source of numerous pop culture references, such as the use of "I'll be back" in countless other media, including different variations of the phrase by Arnold himself in many of his subsequent films and, in cameo appearances by Robert Patrick, as the T-1000, in Last Action Hero and Wayne's World. The Simpsons have also spoofed both films and the T-1000, in particular, on a number of occasions.

Terminator 2 is the only film in the series to garner attention at the Academy Awards, with six nominations and four wins, and is rated highly among critics. In 2006 the readers of Total Film rated The Terminator as cinema's 72nd best film and Terminator 2: Judgment Day the 33rd.

The first five Terminator films have had very respectable box office gross, though after James Cameron left the series it saw diminishing returns in subsequent films. The Terminator made $78 million worldwide, far surpassing its $6 million budget and becoming a major sleeper hit. Terminator 2: Judgment Day grossed approximately $520 million globally, becoming a major blockbuster and the top-grossing film of 1991. Terminator 3: Rise of the Machines earned $433 million, making it the seventh highest-grossing film of 2003. Terminator Salvation grossed an estimated $371 million worldwide, a figure below industry expectations. Terminator Genisys grossed $440 million. Terminator: Dark Fate raised approximately $261 million worldwide with an estimated loss of $130 million, becoming the least successful film in the franchise and a box-office bomb.

== Music ==
=== Soundtracks ===
| Title | U.S. release date | Length | Composer(s) | Label |
|---|---|---|---|---|
| The Terminator: Original Soundtrack | 1984 | 35:32 | Brad Fiedel | Enigma Records |
| Terminator 2: Judgment Day (Original Motion Picture Soundtrack) | July 1, 1991 | 53:01 | Brad Fiedel | Varèse Sarabande |
| Terminator 3: Rise of the Machines (Original Motion Picture Soundtrack) | June 24, 2003 | 51:22 | Marco Beltrami | Varèse Sarabande |
| Terminator: The Sarah Connor Chronicles (Original Television Soundtrack) | December 23, 2008 | 63:54 | Bear McCreary | La-La Land Records |
| Terminator Salvation: Original Soundtrack | May 19, 2009 | 50:27 | Danny Elfman | Reprise Records |
| Terminator Genisys: Music from the Motion Picture | June 17, 2015 | 75:05 | Lorne Balfe | Skydance Media Paramount Music |
| Terminator: Dark Fate (Music from the Motion Picture) | November 1, 2019 | 58:00 | Tom Holkenborg | Paramount Music |
| Terminator Zero (original series soundtrack) | August 30, 2024 | 73:45 | Michelle Birsky and Kevin Henthorn | Lakeshore Records |

== Other media ==
=== Video games ===
Various video games have been released since 1991.

=== Novels ===
Various novels have been released since 1985.

=== Comics ===
==== The Terminator spin-off comics ====
In 1988, NOW Comics published an ongoing series with John Connor as the main character in 2031, after sending Kyle Reese back to 1984 to protect his mother. The Terminators in this canon had more human-like endoskeletons and some issues would deal with subordinates of Connor's in the ruins of certain geographic areas. The seventeen issue series was followed by two limited series.

Dark Horse Comics acquired the rights in 1990. In The Terminator (with Tempest added in trade paperbacks to distinguish itself from other comics), a group of human soldiers and four Terminators come to the present, to stop Skynet in differing ways. In the sequel, Secondary Objectives, the surviving Terminator is reprogrammed to destroy another Terminator sent to aid him and kill Sarah Connor. In its sequel, The Enemy Within, a team of human assassins attempt to return to the past and kill a Skynet developer. The 1992 Endgame concludes this arc. Human colonel Mary Randall protects Sarah Connor as she goes into labor.

Dark Horse published a 1992 one-shot written by James Dale Robinson and drawn by Matt Wagner. Here, a female Terminator and a resistance fighter battle for the life of a woman named Sarah Connor, but not the correct one. The comic book had the unusual feature of a physical "pop-up" in one scene.

A 1993 limited series Hunters and Killers, set during the war, has special Terminators created to impersonate leaders in the Russian resistance. Another limited series, published in 1998, follows the misadventures of two malfunctioning Terminators in Death Valley. This set up the following year's comic The Dark Years, set in 2030. In The Dark Years, a Terminator is sent to eliminate John Connor and his mother in 1999. In 2013, Dark Horse released a sequel comic based on the 2009 film Terminator Salvation, entitled Terminator Salvation: The Final Battle.

Malibu Comics published twin series in 1995. One was a sequel to Terminator 2: Judgment Day, in which Sarah and John encounter two Terminators. The other was a prequel that explains the scenario. The conclusions to the series were published in one issue.

Beckett Comics published three series to promote Terminator 3: Rise of the Machines, each consisting of two issues.

Terminator 2: Infinity (later simply Terminator Infinity (2007) comic book series by Dynamite Entertainment, was set in 2033. It was, for two issues, tied into another one of Dynamite's publications, called Painkiller Jane.

Dynamite's continuation, Terminator: Revolution and IDW Publishing's Salvation tie-in comic book were legally possible as the former was specifically based on the Terminator 2 license.

==== Crossover comics ====
Terminators have crossed over with RoboCop, Superman and Alien vs. Predator. In RoboCop versus The Terminator (1992) and Superman vs. The Terminator: Death to the Future (2000), the heroes must prevent the war-ravaged future.

In 2000's Alien versus Predator versus The Terminator from Dark Horse, where Skynet, has reactivated farther in the future and is creating an Alien-Terminator hybrid. Ellen Ripley's clone (from Alien Resurrection) and the Predators join forces to stop Skynet.

In 2020, Dark Horse and IDW Publishing published Transformers vs. The Terminator, in which the Autobots and the Decepticons are antagonised by the T-800 as Skynet sends the Terminator back through time to destroy the Cybertronians and restore the future timeline.

=== Collectible card game ===
The Terminator Collectible Card Game was released in 2000 by Precedence.

=== Role-playing game ===
First announced in 2020 by Nightfall Games, The Terminator RPG was released in digital form on June 1, 2022, with a physical version following later in the year. The game is based on the first film and Dark Horse Comics line of graphic novels and comics.

=== Theme park attractions ===
T2-3D: Battle Across Time, a film ride based on the franchise, opened at Universal Studios Florida in 1996. The ride is presented as the original sequel to Terminator 2: Judgment Day. It features Arnold Schwarzenegger, Linda Hamilton, Edward Furlong, and Robert Patrick reprising their roles as the Terminator, Sarah Connor, John Connor, and the T-1000, respectively. James Cameron was one of three directors on the attraction, which marked his last major involvement with the franchise until Terminator: Dark Fate.

Terminator Salvation: The Ride operated at California's Six Flags Magic Mountain from 2009 to 2010. Terminator X: A Laser Battle for Salvation operated at various locations beginning in 2009.

== Canceled projects ==
=== Terminator Salvation trilogy ===
In May 2007, the production rights to the Terminator series had passed from the feuding of Andrew G. Vajna and Mario Kassar to The Halcyon Company. The producers of the company hoped to start a new trilogy based on the franchise. However, due to the box office failure of the fourth film and legal troubles, the Salvation trilogy was ultimately cancelled. William Wisher, who co-wrote the first two films, had written material for a potential Terminator 5 and Terminator 6 that would follow on from the events of Terminator Salvation. The two-part story would involve an element of time travel that brings back the deceased character of Sarah Connor, allowing her to interact with Kyle Reese beyond their initial meeting in the first film. Schwarzenegger would also reprise his role for the sixth film. The films would also include new Terminator villains from Skynet. Wisher had written a 24-page film treatment for Terminator 5 and a four-page concept outline for Terminator 6.

=== Terminator Genisys trilogy ===
By December 2013, there were plans for Terminator Genisys to be the start of a new trilogy of films. In September 2014, Paramount announced release dates for the two Genisys sequels: May 19, 2017 and June 29, 2018. Terminator Genisys producer David Ellison described the film and its intended trilogy as standalone projects based on Cameron's original Terminator films. Ellison stated Terminator Genisys is neither a sequel or a prequel to the previous films, saying: "For us this is Terminator 1, this is not Terminator 5". The sequels to Genisys were tentatively known as Terminator 2 and Terminator 3. The two sequels were to be filmed back to back during nine months of continuous shooting.

The storylines for the two sequels were devised by Genisys writers Kalogridis and Lussier. The trilogy was being planned out before Terminator Genisys began filming, as producers David Ellison and Dana Goldberg wanted the full storyline finished ahead of time rather than having to "figure it out as you go along", stating: "We spent a lot of time breaking that down, and we do know what the last line of the third movie is, should we be lucky enough to get to make it". Production on the sequels was contingent on whether Terminator Genisys would be successful; development of the trilogy stalled in 2015 after the film's disappointing box-office performance. The planned sequels were ultimately cancelled, with Terminator 2 being removed from Paramount's release schedule in January 2016.

The new trilogy would have explained who sent Pops back in time to protect Sarah Connor. In February 2015, Schwarzenegger stated he would reprise his role as Pops for the second film in the trilogy, with filming set to begin in 2016. Jai Courtney and Matt Smith would also reprise their respective roles as Kyle Reese and Skynet. J. K. Simmons would have had further involvement in the new trilogy, and Dayo Okeniyi would have a significant role reprising his character Danny Dyson in the second film, which would have focused on John Connor's life after becoming part machine. Jason Clarke said about the cancelled Genisys sequel:

What I remember was that second one was going to be about John's journey after he was taken by Skynet…like going down to what he became; half machine, half man. That's where the second one was going to start, and that's about all I knew. It's such a bummer we didn't get to do that.

=== Terminator Genisys–connected television series ===
By December 2013, Skydance Productions and Annapurna Pictures were developing a new Terminator television series. Ashley Miller and Zack Stentz, who had worked together on Terminator: The Sarah Connor Chronicles, were named as writers and executive producers. The series was to deviate from the franchise's history at a critical moment in 1984's The Terminator and would also integrate with the planned sequels to Terminator Genisys.

=== Terminator: Dark Fate trilogy ===
Plans for a new Terminator film trilogy were announced in July 2017. While working on the story for Terminator: Dark Fate that year, Cameron and the writers envisioned the film as the first in the new trilogy. They also worked out the basic storylines for each planned film.

In October 2019, Cameron stated that sequels to Terminator: Dark Fate would further explore the relationship between humans and artificial intelligence, while stating that a resolution between the two feuding sides would be the ultimate outcome. That month, Schwarzenegger stated that Cameron would write the Terminator: Dark Fate sequels and that Cameron would begin work on the next film in early 2020, for release in 2022.

Although the events of Terminator: Dark Fate erase Schwarzenegger's T-800 character from existence, Cameron did not rule out the possibility of Schwarzenegger reprising the character: "Look, if we make a shit ton of money with this film [Terminator: Dark Fate] and the cards say that they like Arnold, I think Arnold can come back. I'm a writer. I can think of scenarios. We don't have a plan for that right now, let me put it that way". Natalia Reyes was to reprise her role for a sequel. Hamilton stated in October that she would probably reprise her role as well, although she joked that she would fake her own death to avoid appearing in it, saying that making Terminator: Dark Fate "really was hard" because of the physical training she had to undergo. Hamilton later said that she would be happy not to star in another Terminator film, but she kept the possibility open, with a potential exception being that a sequel be done on a smaller scale and budget.

Dark Fate director Tim Miller stated in November that he did not expect to return for a sequel. Production of a sequel was contingent on whether Dark Fate was a box-office success. Following the underwhelming performance of Dark Fate at the box-office (with an estimated loss of at least $120 million), sources close to Skydance told The Hollywood Reporter that there are no plans for further films, effectively cancelling the planned Dark Fate trilogy.

== See also ==
- List of the highest-grossing media franchises
- Temporal paradox
- Time travel in fiction
