= Terminator: Dark Fate (soundtrack) =

Terminator: Dark Fate (Music from the Motion Picture)

Film score by Tom Holkenborg
- Released: November 1, 2019
- Recorded: 2018–2019
- Studios: Newman Scoring Stage, Twentieth Century Fox Studios
- Genre: Film score
- Length: 58:00
- Label: Paramount Music

Tom Holkenborg chronology
Alita: Battle Angel (2019)	Terminator: Dark Fate (2019)	Sonic the Hedgehog (2020)

Terminator: Dark Fate (Music from the Motion Picture) is the soundtrack album to the 2019 film of the same name directed by Tim Miller, featuring musical score composed by Tom Holkenborg in his second collaboration with Miller after Deadpool. The film is the sixth installment in the Terminator franchise, and a follow-up to Terminator 2: Judgment Day (1991), ignoring the events that occurred in the other installments, post James Cameron's return and creative control to the franchise after directing the first two installments. The film stars Linda Hamilton and Arnold Schwarzenegger as Sarah Connor and the T-800 Terminator, respectively, reuniting the actors after 23 years.

Holkenborg wrote the film's music for nearly a year, to study on the first two films and also pay homage to Brad Fiedel's musical work in those films. He produced the album with varied musical styles, including a Latino-infused approach for the "Terminator" theme and working on a range of instruments: both acoustic and electronic, as well as sounds originated from real-life objects. He also added orchestral music in few emotional sequences, while limited its use throughout the film.

The album was released on November 1, 2019 under the Paramount Music label, to positive response praising Tom Holkenborg's composition, instrumentation and the homage to the iconic Terminator themes, created by Brad Fiedel. It was released in vinyl by Mondo on February 21, 2020.

== Development ==
Holkenborg took nearly a year on writing the film's music. While composing for Dark Fate, he recreated Brad Fiedel's original "Terminator" theme but infused it with acoustic guitars and brass to reflect the ethnicity of Dani Ramos (Natalia Reyes). He added "the Terminator coming from the future, even though he's played by a Latino actor, he's still a robot, so I thought it was less appropriate for him. And the same with Sarah Connor and the Terminator character, Carl. In this case, that's the name of Arnold in this movie. He renames himself Carl. So I thought it was less important for them. I was able to really show, on the score, the roots of where this girl is coming from." That cue was written within eight weeks. He also recreated few themes from the second instalment, Judgment Day (1991), as Dark Fate was considered as the direct sequel to the film after James Cameron returned to creative control as an executive producer. To prepare for Dark Fate, Holkenborg studied about The Terminator and Judgment Day, before working on the score and felt that "he wanted the music of Dark Fate to be an homage to composer Brad Fiedel's original work, but also the natural progression of this story over the last 25 years."

"Since we live in this new electronic world, the technology development over the last 20-odd years has been insane, compared to where we were in 1991. I remember that really well. I was making music in 1984 and in 1991. I remember how limited the capabilities were to really explore electronic music. But now, in 2019, the only limitation is your fantasy. There's so many things you can do, musically, in the electronic landscape right now. For me, it was important to pay homage to the original score of Brad Fiedel, but at the same time, I am hired as the composer. It's not a matter of doing it literally the same as he did it. It was very important that I put my stamp on it."

— Holkenborg, on the changing trends and paying homage to Brad Fiedel's score, in an interview to Screen Rant.

Holkenborg discussed with Miller on the film's music, with the latter received notes from Cameron via the production team and sent it back to him. He used minimal orchestra and added more sound design, blending to the percussion instruments to "make the music emotional". He also subtly used the orchestra with a minor reduction in the tempo, and also used Arnold's theme in adagio which was the "crowning moment". He mentioned on crafting the musical language of the Rev-9 Terminator, a challenge, as "the Rev-9 is a combination of a synthesizer bass line accompanied with brass and strings that bend up" and coupled it with the "very threatening sound design and that became the Rev-9's fingerprint". He used a blaring prison alarm for the action sequence in an immigration detention center as he wanted it to be a part of the music, and when the cue was delivered, which was included in the film. He described his score as being "way more aggressive" than Fiedel's.

Holkenborg used approximately 15 instruments while composing, majorly includes cello, bass, electric guitar, bass guitar, Spanish guitars, percussion, drum kit, along with synthesisers. He also used the sound of an anvil, kitchen sink and washing machine, which were sampled and treated to "re-purpose sounds that we know in our daily lives into musical instruments", which he described it as "fun to create such music and stress-free".

== Track listing ==
Terminator: Dark Fate (Music from the Motion Picture)
No.	Title	Length
1.	"Terminated (Note: This track references Brad Fiedel's "I'll Be Back" from Terminator 2: Judgment Day.)"	1:28
2.	"My Name Is Dani"	3:39
3.	"REV 9"	3:10
4.	"Iron Spike"	2:52
5.	"Enter Sarah"	0:59
6.	"Grace"	4:24
7.	"Drones Coming"	1:46
8.	"The Wall"	4:12
9.	"Terminator"	2:57
10.	"Coyote"	2:18
11.	"The Picture on the Fridge"	0:42
12.	"C5"	4:10
13.	"HUMV"	1:59
14.	"You Saved Me"	5:41
15.	"Screaming Turbines"	4:13
16.	"For John"	7:59
17.	"Epilogue"	1:10
18.	"Dark Fate (Note: This track references Brad Fiedel's "Main Title (Terminator 2 Theme)" from Terminator 2: Judgment Day.)"	4:19
Total length:		58:00

== Reception ==
Zanobard Reviews wrote: "Tom Holkenborg's score for Terminator: Dark Fate is absolutely superb. He's always rather been in his element with dark and dramatic action music, and so he feels right at home as a composer here. Said cues here are of his typical loud and thrilling style, and hearing Fiedel's Terminator theme alongside them at various intervals just makes them even better (see For John). The softer side of the score is also pretty good, with cues like My Name Is Dani and You Saved Me being great examples of how Holkenborg isn't just good at composing fast-paced orchestra. However, the score could actually have done with a couple more action cues, along with a few more appearances of the original Terminator theme as well as the composer's new Dark Fate motifs."

Filmtracks.com wrote: "you have to commend Holkenborg for returning to Fiedel's established themes, samples, and modes. Enthusiasts of the franchise's vintage, metallic thrashing for action scenes will appreciate the bare and raw carnage that Dark Fate extends. Many casual moviegoers will also appreciate the better enunciation of the five-note concept rhythm of coolness and Sarah's main theme in the closing scenes. But the actual spotting, rendering, and placement of this score is oddly dissatisfying throughout. There are better fan-made tributes to Fiedel's original material than what we hear from a composer paid significant money to produce generally the same thing, and Balfe's arrangement of the Judgement Day end titles remains superior." Jonathan Broxton of Movie Music UK wrote: "With the exception of the lovely acoustic guitar writing for Dani, most of Holkenborg's action music treads a fine line, sometimes coming across as competent but workmanlike, but much too often being overly-raucous, overly-belligerent, and overly-irritating. Absent of Fiedel's theme, this would be a score I would avoid like the plague, but Holkenborg's contemporary updating of the piece, and its clever interpolation into the body of the score, allows me to give it a hesitant recommendation."

== Credits ==
Credits adapted from CD liner notes.

- Music composed, produced and mixed by – Tom Holkenborg
- Additional music – Antonio Di Iorio
- Programming – Jacopo Trifone, Jarrod Royles-Atkins, Shwan Askari, Steve Silvers, Tom Holkenborg
- Recording – Alan Meyerson, Chris Fogel
- Mastering – Tom Holkenborg, James Plotkin
- Technical score engineer – Jacopo Trifone, Sara Barone

Instruments

- Cello – Armen Ksajikian, Dennis Karmazyn, Eric Byers, Erika Duke-Kirkpatrick, Jacob Braun, Michael Kaufman, Paula Hochhalter, Vanessa Freebairn-Smith, Steve Erdody
- Cimbasso – Gary Hickman, Blake Cooper
- Contrabass – Christian Kollgaard, David Parmeter, Drew Dembowski, Edward Meares, Geoff Osika, Michael Valerio, Nicolas Philippon, Steve Dress, Thomas Harte, Nico Carmine Abondolo
- Horn – Alex Camphouse, Amy Rhine, Amy Sanchez, Benjamin Jaber, Brad Warnaar, Daniel Kelley, Danielle Ondarza, Dylan Hart, Jaclyn Rainey, John Mason, Joshua Paulus, Katelyn Faraudo, Keith Popejoy, Laura Brenes, Mark Adams, Mike McCoy, Paul Klintworth, Stephanie Stetson, Steven Becknell, Teag Reaves, Dave Everson
- Trombone – Alan Kaplan, Andrew Martin, William Reichenbach, Craig Gosnell, David Ryan, John Lofton, Phillip Keen, Steven Suminski, Steven Trapani, Steven Holtman, William Booth, Alexander Iles
- Trumpet – Christopher Still, Robert Schaer, Thomas Hooten, Wayne Bergeron, Jon Lewis
- Tuba – Doug Tornquist
- Viola – Aaron Oltman, Alma Fernandez, Andrew Duckles, Carolyn Riley, David Walther, Zach Dellinger, Jonathan Moerschel, Luke Maurer, Shawn Mann, Victoria Miskolczy, Victor De Almeida, Robert Brophy
- Violin – Alyssa Park, Amy Hershberger, Ana Landauer, Andrew Bulbrook, Benjamin Powell, Benjamin Jacobson, Caroline Campbell, Charlie Bisharat, Darius Campo, Dimitrie Leivici, Eun-Mee Ahn, Grace Oh, Helen Nightengale, Irina Voloshina, Jennifer Fischer, Jessica Guideri, Ken Aiso, Kevin Connolly, Kevin Kumar, Luanne Homzy, Lucia Micarelli, Maia Jasper-White, Marc Sazer, Natalie Leggett, Neil Samples, Paul Henning, Phillip Levy, Rafael Rishik, Roberto Cani, Roger Wilkie, Sandra Cameron, Shalini Vijayan, Songa Lee, Tamara Hatwan, Yelena Yegoryan, Julie Ann Gigante

Orchestra

- Concertmaster – Bruce Dukov
- Conductor – Conrad Pope, Edward Trybek
- Contractor – Peter Rotter
- Orchestration – Edward Trybek, Henri Wilkinson, Jonathan Beard, Tom Holkenborg

Cover art

- Art direction and layout – Dan Goldwasser, Mo Shafeek
- Design – Warm Butter Design
- Illustration – Sara Deck

Management

- Executive in charge of music – Randy Spendlove
- Executive album producer – MV Gerhard, Matt Verboys
- Music production services – Michiel Groeneveld
