= Terminator: The Sarah Connor Chronicles (soundtrack) =

Terminator: The Sarah Connor Chronicles (Original Television Soundtrack)

Soundtrack album by Bear McCreary
- Released: December 23, 2008
- Recorded: 2007–2008, Los Angeles
- Genres: Television score; Popular music
- Length: 1:03:54
- Label: La-La Land Records
- Producers: Bear McCreary; Steve Kaplan

Bear McCreary chronology
Eureka (2008)	Terminator: The Sarah Connor Chronicles (2008)	Caprica (2009)

Terminator: The Sarah Connor Chronicles (Original Television Soundtrack) is the soundtrack album of the television series of the same name based on the Terminator franchise. The score was released by La-La Land Records who issued the soundtrack album on December 23, 2008.

Composed by Bear McCreary, it features the series opening title and closing themes as well as stand-out themes and musical cues from various episodes of the show's first season and from the first two episodes of the second season. The soundtrack also includes a cover of the Rev. Gary Davis gospel song "Samson and Delilah", arranged by McCreary and performed by Shirley Manson, who joined the series cast at the start of the second season.

McCreary, series producer Josh Friedman, and actors Thomas Dekker and Shirley Manson each contributed personal notes within the release sleeve-notes.

== Track listing ==
No.	Title	Performed by	Length
1.	"Samson and Delilah" (from "Samson and Delilah")	Shirley Manson	4:56
2.	"Terminator: The Sarah Connor Chronicles Opening Title" (Includes "The Terminator Theme" by Brad Fiedel)		0:43
3.	"Sarah Connor's Theme" (from "Pilot")		3:15
4.	"Cromartie in the Hospital" (from "The Turk")		1:08
5.	"Andy Goode's Turk" (from "Queen's Gambit")		3:09
6.	"Central America" (from "Queen's Gambit")		1:32
7.	"John and Riley" (from "Automatic for the People")		2:25
8.	"Derek Reese" (from "Queen's Gambit" and "The Demon Hand")		2:51
9.	"Ain't We Famous" (from "Automatic for the People" [written by Brendan McCreary])	BrEndAn's Band	3:34
10.	"Motorcycle Robot Chase" (from "Gnothi Seauton")	Captain Ahab	2:48
11.	"The Hand of God" (from "The Demon Hand")		3:08
12.	"Prisoners of War" (from "Dungeons & Dragons")		6:23
13.	"Miles Dyson's Grave" (from "The Turk")		2:41
14.	"Atomic Al's Merry Melody" (from "Automatic for the People")		1:21
15.	"The Reese Boys" (from "What He Beheld")		1:39
16.	"Removing Cameron's Chip" (from "Vick's Chip")		3:13
17.	"Ellison Spared" (from "What He Beheld")		2:21
18.	"I Love You" (from "Samson and Delilah")		2:28
19.	"Catherine Weaver" (from "Samson and Delilah")		2:03
20.	"Derek's Mission" (from "Dungeons & Dragons")		1:45
21.	"There's a Storm Coming" (from "Dungeons & Dragons")		3:00
22.	"Highway Battle" (from "Queen's Gambit")		3:56
23.	"Perfect Creatures" (from "The Demon Hand")		2:13
24.	"Terminator: The Sarah Connor Chronicles End Credits"		0:35

== Compiling the album ==
The Terminator: The Sarah Connor Chronicles soundtrack collects several character themes (Sarah Connor, Derek Reese and Catherine Weaver's themes feature, as do variations on James Ellison and Andy Goode's themes) and also collects some other stand out pieces featured across the series first eleven episodes. Although Terminator Cameron is a central character in the show, no theme was written for her.

=== "Samson and Delilah" ===
In April 2008, before production on the second season of Terminator... was announced, Josh Friedman wanted the season to begin with a companion piece to the final episode of the first, in which antagonist Terminator Cromartie massacres an HRT led by series regular James Ellison to the musical accompaniment of Johnny Cash's "The Man Comes Around". Friedman became aware of a video of gospel song "Samson and Delilah" performed live by Bruce Springsteen, which had been uploaded to YouTube. The audio from the video would be unusable for a television broadcast, and as Springsteen never recorded a studio version of the song, Friedman asked McCreary if he could arrange a version of it to open the second season of the show.

After spending some time concentrating on other projects, McCreary decided the track would work best with a gospel arrangement incorporated with elements from the Terminator... score. While discussing the concept with Friedman, McCreary discovered that Garbage vocalist Shirley Manson had been recently cast as a recurring T-1001 Terminator for the series' second season. McCreary requested that Manson be the vocalist on "Samson and Delilah", leaving it up to Friedman to ask her to do it. Manson was initially hesitant to record a song for the show, not wanting to remind audiences of her singing career while trying to break out as an actor. After Manson agreed, McCreary presented a rough demo of the track to both Friedman and Manson. Friedman gave creative control over the track to McCreary and Manson, who wanted the track to "have a somewhat authentic quality to it, rather than be traditionally orchestrated like most cinematic scores".

McCreary recorded the rhythm sections of the song with Ira Ingber and Steve Bartek on guitars, John Avila on bass and Nate Wood on drums, while Steve Kaplan co-produced and engineered the music. After McCreary recorded the orchestration and rock instrument elements to the track, Manson recorded the vocals with her engineer Billy Bush.

=== "Ain't We Famous" ===
For the second episode of season two, McCreary was required to choose music to play on a jukebox during a bar scene involving Cameron playing pool undercover. Rather than write a brand new composition, McCreary chose a song titled "Ain't We Famous", written by his brother, giving his band the chance to record a studio version of the track.

=== "Atomic Al's Merry Melody" ===
During the same episode, both Sarah Connor and Cameron view a safety training video featuring an animated character named "Atomic Al". McCreary composed an orchestral animation score for the 45-second expository sequence, inspired by composers Carl Stalling's Looney Tunes themes, Scott Bradley's Tom and Jerry themes and Bruce Broughton's Tiny Toon Adventures theme.

"Atomic Al's Merry Melody" is also used in the background of the second episode of Caprica, when Lacy has lunch at the home of Sister Clarice Willow.

== Credits & personnel ==
Performers

- Violin: Benedikt Brydern, Paul Cartwright, Anna Stafford, Martin St. Pierre, Erica Walzak
- Baritone violin: Robert Anderson
- Violoncello: Jacob Szekely
- Woodwinds: Chris Bleth
- Additional woodwinds: John Yoaklim
- Acoustic & electric guitars: Steve Bartek, Ira Ingber
- Electric bass: John Avila
- Drum kit: Nate Wood
- Metallic drums & other percussion: M.B. Gordy
- Additional sequencing: Jonathan Snipes
- MIDI programming: Bear McCreary

Publishing

All tracks published by Warner-Olive Music, LLC (ASCAP) except:

- Track 1: Published by Chandos Music Co. (ASCAP)
- Track 9: Published by Remixnoise (ASCAP)
- Track 14: Published by Conan the Furky Music (ASCAP)

Track 2 includes "The Terminator Theme" published by Universal - Polygram Int. Publ, Inc. (ASCAP) o/b/o Euphonius Music (ASCAP)

Production

- Executive album producers: Josh Friedman, John Wirth and James Middleton
- Soundtrack album producers: MV Gerhard, Matt Verboys and Ford A. Thaxton
- Music produced by: Bear McCreary and Steve Kaplan
- Score orchestrated by: Brendan Roberts and Bear McCreary
- Score recorded and mixed by: Steve Kaplan
- Assistant engineers: Laurence Schwarz and Paul E. Sobosky
- Music editor: Michael Beber
- Digitally edited and mastered by: James Nelson at Digital Outland
- Contractor: Aaron A. Roathe
- Scoring assistants: Michael Beach, Brendan McCreary and Jonathan Ortega
- CD art direction: Mark Banning
- Executive for Warner Bros. Television: Bronwyn Savasta
- Business affairs for Warner Bros. Television: Keith Zajic and Dick Herbert

== Reception ==
Steven Hurst, writing for Den of Geek, rated the soundtrack three out of five stars. He noted that the score is largely its own, rather than relying on the sound of the film series. Because it is a television score, Hurst found that it can be repetitious at times. However, he praised the number of tracks, writing "it isn't like there is no wealth of choice. Quantity for sure, with a higher value of quality than you might hope for."
