= Terminator 3: Rise of the Machines (soundtrack) =

Terminator 3: Rise of the Machines (Original Motion Picture Soundtrack)

Film score by Marco Beltrami
- Released: June 24, 2003
- Recorded: 2002–2003
- Studios: Sony Scoring Stage, Sony Pictures Studios, Culver City, California; Warner Bros. Recording Studios, Hollywood, California
- Genre: Film score
- Length: 51:22
- Label: Varèse Sarabande
- Producer: Marco Beltrami

Marco Beltrami chronology
Blade II (2002)	Terminator 3: Rise of the Machines (2003)	Hellboy (2004)

Terminator 3: Rise of the Machines (Original Motion Picture Soundtrack) is the film score to the 2003 film Terminator 3: Rise of the Machines directed by Jonathan Mostow, which is the third instalment in the Terminator franchise and a sequel to Terminator 2: Judgment Day (1991). Marco Beltrami composed the musical score, with the series' leitmotif by Brad Fiedel was not used, though it was featured in the film's end credits. The score was completely orchestral compared to Fiedel's electronic score in the first two films. The film's soundtrack was released by Varèse Sarabande on June 24, 2003.

== Development and production ==
Marco Beltrami composed the music for Terminator 3: Rise of the Machines, replacing the original Terminator composer Brad Fiedel. During the editing process, the temp tracks included many of Beltrami's scores, such as Mimic (1997), The Crow: Salvation (2000), The Watcher (2000), the first three Scream films, and I Am Dina (2002). Mostow liked the scores and insisted to meet Beltrami. Afterwards, Mostow mentioned that since Rise of the Machines was a high-profile film, several composers are lined up for it but assured that he would push Beltrami as the frontrunner. That December, Beltrami was announced as the composer. He then came up with a palette sounds, with few of them inspired from previous Terminator films and wrote thematic materials afterwards; Beltrami began scoring individual scenes after Christmas 2002.

Beltrami considered Rise of the Machines as a complete entity to itself and though he was inspired by Brad Fiedel's score for Terminator 2: Judgment Day (1991), he wanted to do something inventive with the score. With controversies from the Terminator fans on whether Fiedel's main theme would be omitted, Beltrami denied having such ideas and instead recorded an updated, orchestral version of that theme. However, when that theme was about to be incorporated into the film, it felt that the theme took the audience out of the picture, bringing back to the predecessor as well; Beltrami admitted on the main theme being used very little in the predecessor. He noted on the sound of metallic motifs which Fiedel used, and with Beltrami making it more orchestrally. Hence the Rise of the Machines had a more orchestral score as opposed to an electronic score, while paying homage to Fiedel's work, but had more action music than the previous film scores.

The idea of a complete orchestral score came from discussions with Mostow, after watching the edit. Beltrami opined on using a larger orchestral score, as the music needed to reflect the emotional aspects of the human characters, over the machines, expanding on the fear of John Connor's character and him developing the courage to do his job. Beltrami further had 120 tracks of synthesizers and electronics but used to work with the orchestra as opposed to supersede it.

The scoring process began in April 2003 and completed scoring it within six weeks. It was recorded with a 94-piece orchestra, 30-piece choir and 13 percussionists and electronic sounds. Approximately 85 minutes of music were recorded for the film, with around 45–50 minutes of it were used in the final score.

== Critical reception ==
Christian Clemmensen of Filmtracks wrote "the muddled underscore is perplexing in its inability to excite, tantalize, or terrify. Even so, orchestral score fans may find Terminator 3 to be more accessible than Fiedel's previous entry in the saga. The disgruntlement remains, however, for strict Terminator fans who have waited far too long for a new Terminator score that powerfully and forcefully does what it should: kick ass." Bret Adams of AllMusic wrote "Mostow and Beltrami definitely put their own stamp on it. Whereas Fiedel's score—especially in the original film—relied heavily on synthesizers and keyboards, Beltrami's Terminator 3: Rise of the Machines' score is a professional, rather standard orchestral work performed by a collective of session musicians credited as the Hollywood Studio Symphony. But some pieces do stand out, such as "A Day in the Life," "Hooked on Multiphonics," "Graveyard Shootout," "Magnetic Personality," and "Terminator Tangle."

Thomas Glorieux of Maintitles wrote "Beltrami does a fair enough attempt at recreating the Fiedel atmosphere and villain sound of T2, succeeding at least on that part with a thumbs up effort. And between all that you receive the familiar Beltrami stabs and rhythms, making it not a particular engrossing experience, but by far an effective one." Gary Datkin of Music Web International called it a "the best new action score since John Williams' Star Wars: Episode II: Attack of the Clones last summer." Steven Horn of IGN wrote "In the end, Beltrami has delivered something of a curiosity. Sometimes quiet and organic, other times loud and abrasive, the overall effect is that of a hodge-podge of musical elements. It seems completely appropriate to the subject matter and yet it lacks a distinctive voice of its own. Unlike the similarly structured score for Aliens, this is not one to listen to over and over again." Todd McCarthy of Variety considered it to be "unobtrusive by current standards".

== Track listing ==
All music is composed by Marco Beltrami except "The Terminator" and "I Told You".

Terminator 3: Rise of the Machines (Original Motion Picture Soundtrack)
No.	Title	Writer(s)	Original artist	Length
1.	"A Day in the Life"			3:41
2.	"Hooked on Multiphonics"			1:47
3.	"Blonde Behind the Wheel"			2:07
4.	"JC Theme"			3:34
5.	"Starting T-1"			1:50
6.	"Hearse Rent a Car"			1:48
7.	"T-X's Hot Tail"			3:39
8.	"Graveyard Shootout"			1:31
9.	"More Deep Thoughts"			0:58
10.	"Dual Terminator"			0:51
11.	"Kicked in the Can"			2:03
12.	"Magnetic Personality"			4:35
13.	"Termina-Tricks"			2:12
14.	"Flying Lessons"			0:56
15.	"What Do You Want on Your Tombstone?"			1:19
16.	"Terminator Tangle"			3:21
17.	"Radio"			2:23
18.	"T3"			3:17
19.	"The Terminator (Note: Based on "The Terminator Theme" from the 1984 film composed by Brad Fiedel.)"	Brad Fiedel	Brad Fiedel	2:21
20.	"Open to Me" (bonus track)	Dillon Dixon	Dillon Dixon	3:46
21.	"I Told You" (bonus track)	Mia Julia	Mia Julia	3:11
Total length:				51:22

== Additional music ==
Songs that are not included on the soundtrack album

- "Dat Funky Man" (performed by William Randolph III; words by Jonathan Mostow)
- "Sugar" (performed by Peter Beckett; words by Jonathan Mostow)
- "Party" (performed by Peter Beckett)
- "Can't Hide This" (performed by Mega Jeff)
- "Macho Man" (performed by Village People)
- "The Current" (performed by Blue Man Group featuring Gavin Rossdale)

== Personnel ==
Credits adapted from liner notes:

- Music composer and producer – Marco Beltrami
- Recording and mixing – Dennis S. Sands
- Mastering – Erick Labson
- Music editor – Bill Abbot
- Assistant music editor – Denise Okimoto
- Pro-tools recordist – Noah Snyder
- Music co-ordinator – Marylou Eales
- Music preparation – Julian Bratolyubov
- Executive producer – Joel Still, Jonathan Mostow, Robert Townson

Orchestra and choir

- Orchestra – Hollywood Studio Symphony
- Orchestration – Bill Boston, Carlos Rodriquez, Ceiri Torjussen, Jeff Atmajian, John Kull, Marco Beltrami, Pete Anthony
- Conductor – Marco Beltrami, Pete Anthony
- Orchestra contractor – Sandy DeCrescent
- Concertmaster – Endre Granat
- Choir – Hollywood Film Chorale
- Choir director – Sally Stevens

Instruments

- Bass – David Parmeter, Drew Dembowski, Michael Valerio, Nicolas Philippon, Oscar Hidalgo, Richard Feves, Steve Edelman, Nico Abondolo
- Bassoon – John Steinmetz, Ken Munday, Rose Corrigan, Michael O'Donovan
- Cello – Antony Cooke, Armen Ksajikian, Chris Ermacoff, David Low, David Speltz, Hugh B. Livingston, John Walz, Matthew Cooker, Sebastian Toettcher, Steve Richards, Timothy Landauer, Steve Erdody
- Clarinet – James M. Kanter, Steven Roberts, Gary S. Bovyer
- Flute – David Shostac, Stephen Kujala, Geraldine Rotella
- Harp – Marcia Dickstein
- Horn – Daniel Kelley, John A. Reynolds, Kurt Snyder, Phillip Edward Yao, Yvonne Suzette Moriarty, Brian D.A. O'Connor
- Keyboards – Bryan Pezzone, Randy Kerber
- Percussion – Alan Estes, Gregory Goodall, Marvin B. Gordy III, Peter Limonick, Thomas Raney, Wade Culbreath
- Synthesizer – Buck Sanders
- Trombone – Andrew Thomas Malloy, George Thatcher, William Booth, Alan Kaplan
- Trumpet – David Washburn, Timothy Divers, Jon Lewis
- Tuba – James M. Self
- Viola – Cassandra Richburg, Dan Neufeld, Darrin Mc Cann, David F. Walther, Jennie Hansen, Keith Greene, Marlow Fisher, Rick Gerding, Simon Oswell, Steven Gordon, Victoria Miskolczy, Brian Dembow
- Violin – Amy Hershberger, Ana Landauer, Anatoly Rosinsky, Claire-Jeanne Martin, Clayton Haslop, Dimitrie Leivici, Eric J. Hosler, Gregory Lee, Haim Shtrum, Helen Nightengale, Jeanne Evans, Jennifer Gordon Levin, Julian Hallmark, Julie Ann Gigante, Kenneth Yerke, Kevin Connolly, Liane Mautner, Marina Manukian, Mario De Leon, Michele Richards, Miran Kojian, Miwako Watanabe, Phillip Levy, Roberto Cani, Robin Olson, Ronald Folsom, Sarah Thornblade, Sungil Lee, Rene Mandel

== Accolades ==
Awards	Category	Recipient(s) and nominee(s)	Result
ASCAP Film and Television Music Awards	Top Box Office Films	Marco Beltrami	Won
