= Terminator Genisys (soundtrack) =

Terminator Genisys: Music from the Motion Picture

Film score by Lorne Balfe
- Released: June 17, 2015
- Studios: AIR Lyndhurst Hall, AIR Studios, London
- Genre: Film score
- Length: 1:15:03
- Labels: Paramount Music; Skydance
- Producers: Lorne Balfe; Hans Zimmer (exec.)

Lorne Balfe chronology
Dough (2015)	Terminator Genisys (2015)	Sommeren '92 (2015)

Terminator Genisys: Music from the Motion Picture is the soundtrack album composed by Lorne Balfe for the 2015 film of the same name, directed by Alan Taylor, which is the fifth installment and a reboot of the Terminator franchise, taking the premise of the original film. The album was initially set to be scored by Christophe Beck, before Balfe replaced him. Hans Zimmer served as the executive producer of the film's soundtrack. The album featured 22 tracks, and was released on June 17, 2015, under the Skydance Media and Paramount Music labels.

== Development ==
During December 2014, Christophe Beck was initially hired to score the film. However, Lorne Balfe replaced Beck as the composer in March 2015. Balfe wanted to create a standalone soundtrack for the film as Terminator Genisys is neither a prequel, nor a sequel. However, he wanted to incorporate Brad Fiedel's iconic theme in The Terminator, as he wanted to "have a nod to the past, but also bring it into the future." While speaking about its resemblance to the previous instalments, Balfe said "There's something about it being organic and manipulating it with the sounds. This is a different kind of Terminator and each film has been different. It's not meant to sound strictly like a Terminator score. There are scenes which are identical to the original and musically I did it exactly the same. I scored it as close as I could possibly get it."

Balfe called it as a hybrid score and though there are massive action cues, the score also featured few emotional cues as "the score needed to be much more personal to match the progression of the movie's character development and convey the relationship between Sarah Connor and the Terminator", while Balfe spent more time, which became "Fate and Hope". He also created few themes for John Connor, and the romantic relationship between Kyle and Sarah, while also scored the "Terminator" theme with the piano and three notes for the film.

== Songs ==
Chinese pop singer Jane Zhang and hip hop artist Big Sean contributed "Fighting Shadows", in both Zhang's first English-language recording and Big Sean's musical feature-film debut. It was released by Def Jam Recordings on July 3, 2015, as a soundtrack bonus track. A music video of the single, produced and directed by Robby Starbuck, included footage from the film. The Ramones' "I Wanna Be Sedated", OneRepublic's "Love Runs Out" and Inner Circle's "Bad Boys" are heard in the film, but not included in the soundtrack.

== Track listing ==
All music is composed by Lorne Balfe, except the bonus track.

Terminator Genisys: Music from the Motion Picture
No.	Title	Length
1.	"Fate and Hope"	3:57
2.	"Better Days (Note: Based on "The Terminator Theme" from the film The Terminator composed by Brad Fiedel.)"	3:05
3.	"Work Camp"	3:37
4.	"Bus Ride"	2:03
5.	"Sarah & Kyle"	4:36
6.	"Alley Confrontation"	2:33
7.	"Sarah Kicks Ass"	1:53
8.	"Cyberdyne"	3:41
9.	"Still After Us"	2:52
10.	"Come With Me"	3:42
11.	"John Connor"	2:56
12.	"It's Really Me"	2:36
13.	"Alcove"	2:17
14.	"I Am More"	2:40
15.	"If You Love Me You Die"	5:52
16.	"Judgment Day"	2:56
17.	"Family"	3:14
18.	"Fight"	3:01
19.	"Sacrifice"	4:21
20.	"Guardianship"	3:26
21.	"What If I Can't?"	4:23
22.	"Terminated"	2:00
23.	"Fighting Shadows" (bonus-track single written by King Logan, Eric Dawkins, Sean Anderson and Jane Zhang)	3:11
Total length:		75:03

== Reception ==
James Southall of Movie Wave wrote, "Terminator Genisys has its moments but goes in one ear, out the other and is completely forgotten as soon as it's over." Filmtracks.com wrote, "Balfe's habit of substituting the film arrangement of important cues with his concept suites hurts this album, as the film versions of the "fate and hope" theme for the Reese trip back to 1984 and the John Connor theme for his own introduction needed to be featured in the proper place in the presentation. The composer should consider placing his concept suites at the start or end of his albums as well. The score was widely distributed digitally, but a very limited commercial pressing on CD became a top collectible within just a few months. Fans took heart in the leaking of 90 minutes of the score, including the pertinent missing cues, and these longer bootlegs circulated widely. In any of its forms, the score's recording is generally dynamic, the synthetic strings, trumpets, and other soloists featured well against the ensemble. Expect to be pleasantly surprised despite nagging spotting issues."

Thomas Glorieux of Maintitles wrote, "Is Terminator Genisys atrocious? Definitely not. At times you're even actually getting music. But the problem is that it's all so common and unoriginal. Plus it's definitely not Terminator music and the RC style just doesn't work for me here. Maybe I'm getting too old for these scores? Perhaps but so is Arny and it seems he's doing alright for Terminator Genisys. I don't know. This isn't Terminator material for me, and feels out of place, despite the attempt to deliver the typical anthems and rhythms." Michael Gingold of Fangoria wrote, "The new music by Lorne Balfe, part of the Hans Zimmer factory, isn't as distinctive."

== Credits ==
Credits adapted from Allmusic

- Lorne Balfe – composer, producer, synth programming
- Hans Zimmer – executive producer, synth programming
- Jason Richmond – music co-ordinator
- Chuck Choi – technical score engineer
- Stephanie McNally – technical score engineer
- Òscar Senén – orchestration
- Patricia Sullivan – mastering
- Alan Meyerson – mixing
- Darren Leigh Purkiss – electronic music programming
- Christian Wenger – recording
- David Metzner – music editor
