= Sonic the Hedgehog (soundtrack) =

Sonic the Hedgehog: Music from the Motion Picture

Film score by Tom Holkenborg
- Released: February 14, 2020
- Recorded: 2019–2020
- Genre: Film score
- Length: 42:47
- Label: Paramount Music

Tom Holkenborg chronology
Terminator: Dark Fate (2019)	Sonic the Hedgehog (2020)	Scoob! (2020)

Singles from Sonic the Hedgehog (soundtrack)
- 1. "Speed Me Up" Released: January 24, 2020

Sonic the Hedgehog: Music from the Motion Picture is the score album for the 2020 film of the same name. The score, which was composed by Tom Holkenborg, was released on February 14, 2020, by Paramount Music in both digital and physical formats. Riff Raff, who had a role in the film but was cut, appears on the soundtrack.

== Background ==
In February 2019, Tom Holkenborg, who previously worked with executive producer Miller on Deadpool, was hired to compose the score. In order to authenticate Masato Nakamura's score from the original Sonic the Hedgehog (1991) and Sonic the Hedgehog 2 (1992) games, Holkenborg used the Yamaha digital FM synthesizers (such as the DX7) similar to the Sega Genesis/Mega Drive console's Yamaha YM2612 sound chip. He felt that "the chip will be able to produce FM synthesis with six operators, so that it might get relatively close to natural-sounding instruments, which was always the goal, to imitate real instruments with synthesizers". In addition to the ethnic instrumentation, Holkenborg also used his own in-built guitar amplifiers, distortion pedals, synthesizers and radio amplifiers.

The score ranged from orchestral to 8-bit synth, blending with techno and electronic sounds. On writing Dr. Robotnik's theme, Holkenborg stated "When you write music for that, you have to take that into account. Yes, he is the bad guy, and he is not a sound person in the movie, it's Dr. Robotnik, but, hell, is he funny. You've got to play with that. Sometimes juxtaposition of things that you don't see actually emphasizes what you see even more. The Thin Red Line is a very good example of that, by Terrence Malick. That is part of the idea of creating music for Robotnik in this film. Something that is dark in nature, but it immediately puts a smile on your face."

== Marketing ==
As a part of promotions, an original song, "Boom" by X Ambassadors, appears on the soundtrack, the single was released on January 24, 2020, by Atlantic Records. "Speed Me Up" by American musicians Wiz Khalifa, Lil Yachty, Ty Dolla Sign, and Sueco the Child received over 15 million streams, along with 1.8 billion views for the "Speed Me Up" TikTok challenge. "Friends" by Hyper Potions, which previously appeared as the opening theme of Sonic Mania, also appears in the film, along with arrangements of tracks from Masato Nakamura's score for the original Sonic the Hedgehog (1991).

== Reception ==
Calling it as a loud, vibrant and fun soundtrack, Zanobard reviews assigned 7/10 and wrote "Sonic The Hedgehog is very different from Holkenborg's usual work, but that doesn't stop it from being highly entertaining, fun-filled work of art." The Sonic Stadium's review stated "The soundtrack is full of standout compositions and demonstrates why Holkenberg is so prolific in Hollywood. But, there is however some element of frustration that Holkenberg has not leant on Sonic's rich musical back catalogue, and although some chiptune elements are deployed, they share no commonality with anything from the Megadrive or Genesis of which fans would be familiar with."

Jonathan Broxton called "Sonic the Hedgehog is the best score of Tom Holkenborg's career to date" and wrote "The themes are memorable and well-integrated into the fabric of the score, the action music is strong and exciting and interesting from a compositional point of view, and the orchestral arrangements allow the ensemble to shine in numerous unexpected ways. The incorporation of 1980s chip-tunes electronica shows an understanding of the heritage of the project, and the references to Masato Nakamura's original music for the game is tasteful and appropriate." Filmtracks.com stated "everything in Sonic the Hedgehog is basically proficient, especially the orchestrations, and the closing thematic summary on the album is not to be missed. But while a movie like this is not high art, there's a nagging feeling that more could have been done with this score to blend the concept's past with tighter new thematic development and enunciation."

== Track list ==
All music is composed by Tom Holkenborg.

No.	Title	Length
1.	"Meet Sonic (Before We Start I Gotta Tell You This)"	1:32
2.	"Welcome to Green Hills"	2:01
3.	"A Very Lonely Life"	2:50
4.	"Dr. Robotnik"	2:56
5.	"That Would Work"	1:48
6.	"Is That a Drone"	3:22
7.	"Things to Do Before I Die"	1:19
8.	"A Visit from the Doctor"	4:01
9.	"But I Will Always Be Faster"	4:19
10.	"SF-Paris-Egypt-SF"	3:18
11.	"Skyscraper"	3:24
12.	"Not a Baby Bigfoot"	2:37
13.	"He Is My Friend"	4:51
14.	"A New Home"	1:14
15.	"Sonic the Hedgehog"	3:15
Total length:		42:47

== Additional music ==
The following songs are also featured in the film despite not being included on the soundtrack:

- "Friends" by Hyper Potions
- "Don't Stop Me Now" by Queen
- "Flight of the Valkyries" by Jim Carrey
- "All Fired Up" by The Lazys
- "White Lightning" by Tennessee River Crooks
- "Bad News" by Ghost Hounds
- "Boom" by X Ambassadors
- "I'm Turnin' "Em Up" by Wyley Randall
- "Love In The City" by John Christopher Stokes
- "Where Evil Grows" by The Poppy Family featuring Terry Jacks
- "Catch Me I'm Falling" by Kelly Finnigan
- "Green Hill Zone" by Masato Nakamura, performed by Jon Batiste

== Credits ==
Credits adapted from Paramount Music.

- Score composer, programmer, and mixer: Tom Holkenborg
- Music editor: Katie Greathouse
- Additional music by: Antonio Di Iorio • Maxwell Karmazyn
- Score conductor: Edward Trybek
- Orchestrators: Edward Trybek • Henri Wilikinson • Jonathan Beard • Tom Holkenborg
- Music preparation by: Edward Trybek • Henri Wilikinson
- Librarian: Josef Zimmerman
- Music contractor: Peter Rotter for Encompass Music Partners
- Additional synth programming by: Sara Barone
- Score recorder: Chris Fogel
- Technical score consultants: Jacopo Trifone • Shwan Askari • Jarrod Royles-Atkins • Gevorg Chepchyan
- Digital recordist: Kevin Globerman
- Music recorded at: ELBO Studios, Glendale, CA
- Music mixed at: Computer Hell Cabin
- Music production services: Michael Groeneveld

=== Musicians ===
- Violins: Bruce Dukov • Julie Ann Gigante • Charlie Bisharat • Helen Nightengale • Jessica Guideri • Luanne Homzy • Maya Magub • Natalie Leggett • Nathan Cole • Philip Levy • Roger Wilkie • Tamara Hatwan • Tereza Stanislav • Benjamin Jacobson
- Violas: Andrew Duckles • Zack Dellinger • Shawn Mann
- Cello: Steve Erdody
- Flutes: Geri Rotella • Jennifer Olson • Heather Clark • Julie Berkert
- Oboes: Lara Wickes • Jennifer Cullinan • Jessica Pearlman
- Clarinets: Stuart Clark • Daniel Higgins • Donald Foster
- Bassoons: Rose Carrigan • Kenneth Munday
- French Horns: David Everson • Andrew Bain • Amy Jo Rhine • Benjamin Jaber • Dylan Hart • Katelyn Faraudo • Laura Brenes • Mark Adams
- Trumpets: Jon Lewis • Robert Schear • Thomas Hooten
- Trombones: Alex Iles • David Rejano Cantero • Steven Holtman • Steven Suminski • Steven Trapani • Will Reichenbach

== Chart performance ==
Chart (2020)	Peak position
US Billboard 200	183
US Soundtrack Albums (Billboard)	23

== See also ==
- Music of Sonic the Hedgehog
