= Terminator 2: Judgment Day (score) =

Film score by Brad Fiedel
- Released: 1991
- Recorded: 1988–91
- Studios: Studio City, Los Angeles; Skywalker Sound, Lucas Valley, California
- Genres: Electronic; orchestral; ambience
- Length: 53:01
- Label: Varèse Sarabande
- Producer: Brad Fiedel

Brad Fiedel chronology
Blood Ties (1991)	Terminator 2: Judgment Day (1991)	Teamster Boss: The Jackie Presser Story (1992)

The original score to the 1991 science-fiction action film, Terminator 2: Judgment Day is composed by Brad Fiedel. The film, directed by James Cameron is a sequel to the 1984 film The Terminator, and the second instalment in the Terminator franchise. Fiedel who scored for the first film using synthesizers and electronic instruments, had produced the score for Terminator 2, in an "acoustic and organic manner". According to Fiedel, he created the score in such a way, to bring a "warmer tone" on depicting the relationship with young John Connor and the Terminator. The recording and production process involved two Fairlight CMI machines and synthesisers, with an ensemble orchestra assisting the electronic sounds.

The first issue of Terminator 2: Judgment Day (Original Motion Picture Soundtrack) was released by Varèse Sarabande in 1991, followed by subsequent reissues in the following years. It was remastered twice for digital and physical releases. The first remastered score was released by Silva Screen in August 2010, and the second remastering under the title Terminator 2: Judgment Day (Original Soundtrack Recording), was released in March 2017 by StudioCanal and UMG.

== Production ==
The Terminator composer Brad Fiedel returned for the sequel. Film industry professionals regarded his return with concern and skepticism; they believed his style would not suit the film. Fiedel produced the score for Terminator 2, even before the film entered production. He quickly realized that he would not receive the finished footage until late in the production after most effects were completed; which made it difficult to commit to decisions such as use of an orchestra because, unlike ambient music, the score had to accompany the on-screen action. He used organic and acoustic sounds, which were compiled using the limited technology he had available. The score was recorded and produced using a Fairlight CMI Series III. Fiedel order two CMIs: one machine was used for producing percussive instruments and the other contained the remaining instruments, and had created all the exact versions of the time signatures and tempos, to carefully sync with the sounds. Both Fiedel and Cameron wanted the musical tone to be "warmer" due to its focus on a nobler Terminator and young John. He then experimented with sounds and shared them with Cameron for feedback.

While The Terminator score had mainly used oscillators and synthesizers, Fiedel recorded real instruments and modified their sounds. He developed a library of sounds for characters such as the T-1000, whose theme was created by sampling brass-instrument players warming up and improvising. Fiedel said to the players, "You're an insane asylum. You're a bedlam of instruments." He slowed down the resulting sample and lowered the pitch, describing it as "artificial intelligent monks chanting". Cameron considered the "atonal" sound "too avant-garde" for him but Fiedel justified it as an accompaniment to Cameron, who was making a film "people have never seen before". The motifs he created, was really almost musically generated from altered forward and backwards sounds of samples.

While post-production happened at the Skywalker Sound in Lucas Valley, California, Fiedel could not hear the final cut, as he was busy on producing the final score at his garage in Studio City, Los Angeles. While working on the film's music, he had a person sitting outside the garage and after Fiedel mixed the cues, he went to Hollywood Burbank Airport to take a flight to Lucas Valley, and submitted the cues to the studio personnel. He felt that the sound really worked well.

== Releases ==
Terminator 2: Judgment Day's soundtrack was first issued by Varèse Sarabande, which released the original version in CDs, LPs and cassettes in 1991, and reissued again in 1993 and 1997. Silva Screen Records released the remastered edition of the score in CD on August 17, 2010, and in vinyl on August 19, 2014. Another remastered edition was published by Universal Music Group and StudioCanal, which released the album on March 24, 2017.

== Reception ==
Writing for the online music database AllMusic, Heather Phares felt that the score "expands on the largely synth-based sound of the original Terminator music with taut, percussive interludes and evocative, symphonic passages". He felt that the selected pieces "range from the spare to the claustrophobic, but all of them capture the post-apocalyptic tension of the film perfectly". Michael Quinn of BBC wrote "T2 emerges as an almost faultless soundtrack, exhaustingly bombastic and ear-splittingly uncompromising as it is. Instead of expanding on the original, Fiedel boils it down, distilling it into a concentrated, metal-clad clenched fist that pounds furiously away with nightmarish intent. As a threnody for the catastrophic events it accompanies, Fiedel’s score is a coruscating cinematic masterpiece. It’s not an easy listen, by any means, but its sheer conviction and willingness to pursue so intense a musical idea – one that vehemently refuses to be diluted by harmonic warmth – makes the soundtrack to T2 all the more compelling."

Writing for Den of Geek, Glen Chapman gave 5/5 to the album and called it as a "classic soundtrack" which is a "worthy addition to any record collection". About the 2010 re-issue, Chapman wrote "Even though there aren’t any extra tracks, it’s easy to hear the care and attention that has gone into the re-master, with the improved audio quality and, as such, it comes highly recommended." Filmtracks.com gave a mixed review, calling it as a "wasted opportunity", and wrote "doesn't mean that the score needed to be a big orchestral affair; that would have defied the personality of the concept. Instead, it means that even in the electronic realm, there were so many possibilities left unexplored that could have yielded a fantastic synthetic score. The title theme remains Fiedel's best and most lasting contribution to cinema and yet the composer did not make any substantial attempt to manipulate it for the purposes of suspense on screen. In terms of the album's listening experience, the highlights are not surprisingly the only three full renderings of the original film's theme [...] despite its dated sound and extremely primitive rendering, the original Terminator score remains the best balanced. Movie franchises, and especially cult favorites, deserve musical continuity, and while Feidel's follow-up score does technologically advance his material from the first film, it doesn't really reflect the depth of the concept."

Critic Jonathan Broxton wrote "Brad Fiedel’s adherence to the sound and texture of the franchise is admirable, and the new material for the T-1000 is certainly memorable and fits the concept of the character well. But, one can’t help but feel that there were a number of missed opportunities here. The lack of any real emotional connective musical tissue between Sarah, John, and the T-101 is disappointing, as is the somewhat predictable nature of some of the action material. Finally – and perhaps worst of all – the score’s apparent use of dated equipment, especially the synth choir and the synth brass, makes the score come dangerously close to undermining itself, with its tinny sound making what should have been emotional and epic seem, at times, weak. On the original Terminator score, when Fiedel was flying by the seat of his pants, doing everything in his garage with no money, the end result was near-miraculous. On Terminator 2, when he’s got a cut of the movie’s $102 million budget to work with, you should really expect more. Casual fans of the franchise will absolutely love it, but anyone looking for a score with perhaps a little more meat on its exoskeleton." Seattle Post-Intelligencer wrote "The overall sound of the album is electronic, but it's been tailored to the scenes painstakingly so that you can get the gist of what's going on in the movie without having it memorized. This soundtrack is fast in all the right places, such as the chase scenes. When you consider that the Terminator franchise is, at its heart, basically an implacable man horror movie, then this CD goes really well with that idea."

In 2024, the score was played at the funeral of Alexei Navalny.

== Track listing ==
No.	Title	Length
1.	"Main Title (Terminator 2 Theme)"	1:56
2.	"Sarah On The Run"	2:31
3.	"Escape From The Hospital (And T1000)"	4:34
4.	"Desert Suite"	3:25
5.	"Sarah's Dream (Nuclear Nightmare)"	1:49
6.	"Attack On Dyson (Sarah's Solution)"	4:07
7.	"Our Gang Goes To Cyberdyne"	3:11
8.	""Trust Me""	1:38
9.	"John & Dyson Into Vault"	0:41
10.	"Swat Team Attacks"	3:22
11.	""I'll Be Back""	3:58
12.	"Helicopter Chase"	2:27
13.	"Tanker Chase"	1:42
14.	""Hasta La Vista, Baby" (T1000 Freezes)"	3:02
15.	"Into The Steel Mill"	1:25
16.	"Cameron's Inferno"	2:37
17.	"Terminator Impaled"	2:05
18.	"Terminator Revives"	2:14
19.	"T1000 Terminated"	1:41
20.	""It's Over" ("Good Bye")"	4:36
Total length:		53:01

== Personnel ==
Credits adapted from CD liner notes.

- Rick Clark – digital remastering
- Peter Compton – release co-ordinator
- Robert Croucher – artwork
- Reynold D'Silva – executive producer
- Brad Fiedel – composer, electronics, liner notes, mixing, producer
- Ross Levinson – mixing
- David Stoner – executive producer

== Chart performance ==
=== Weekly charts ===
Chart (1991–92)	Peak position
UK Albums (Official Charts)	26
US Billboard 200	70
