= Speed Me Up =

Song from the film Sonic the Hedgehog

Single by Wiz Khalifa, Ty Dolla Sign, Lil Yachty and Sueco the Child
- Released: January 24, 2020
- Genre: Hip-hop
- Length: 3:34
- Label: Atlantic Records
- Songwriters: Akeem Hayes; Alexander Krashinsky; Cameron Thomaz; David Biral; Denzel Baptiste; Jad Antoury; Miles Parks McCollum; Nye Lee Jr.; Tyrone Griffin Jr.; William Schultz
- Producer: Take a Daytrip

Music video
- "Speed Me Up" on YouTube

"Speed Me Up" is a song by American musicians Wiz Khalifa, Ty Dolla Sign, Lil Yachty, and Sueco the Child. Produced by Take a Daytrip, it was released by Atlantic Records on January 24, 2020 and featured on the soundtrack to the film Sonic the Hedgehog. The song was praised for its "catchy" chorus and "surprisingly chill groove", as well as its accompanying pixel art-based music video.

== Background ==
"Speed Me Up" was released on January 24, 2020 by Atlantic Records, and was produced by Take a Daytrip. The song appears in the film Sonic the Hedgehog and was also released as a promotional track for it.

== Lyrics ==
Khalifa and Lil Yachty include lyrical references to Sonic franchise characters Tails and Knuckles in their verses. Ty Dolla Sign also mentions a few notable personalities in the song, including National Basketball Association (NBA) star LeBron James and American rappers Nipsey Hussle and Tay-K.

All four performed on Jimmy Kimmel Live!, with Ty Dolla Sign switching the lyrics in the original song that mention LeBron James to instead mention another NBA star, Kobe Bryant, who was killed in a helicopter crash two days after the song's release.

== Reception ==
Reid McCarter of The A.V. Club described the song as being "catchy as hell" but also "littered with goofy references to the Sonic games". He wrote that its music video, "while incredibly dumb, is a cornucopia of hilarious imagery". Napier Lopez of The Next Web wrote that the song had a "surprisingly chill groove", while also noting the recurring sounds of ring jingles and pixelated art present in the song's music video. Emma Kent of Eurogamer also described the chorus as "surprisingly catchy". Christopher Rosen of Vanity Fair wrote, "you won't need all the rings to make it through this one". Julia Alexander of The Verge praised the song's music video and its use of pixelation. Bryn Gelbart wrote that the song was "loaded with talent". "Speed Me Up" received more than 15 million streams and 1.8 billion views overall as part of a TikTok challenge that promoted the song.

== Music video ==
The music video features clips of the film Sonic the Hedgehog, and 16-bit versions of the movie sets shown in the clips. It starts with Wiz Khalifa sitting on a couch playing Sonic the Hedgehog on a Sega Genesis. Sonic opens up a ring portal and Khalifa enters the game as a 16-bit version of himself. He joins Sonic in his adventures, running across Green Hills and picking up gold rings along the way. Lil Yachty, Ty Dolla Sign, and Sueco all join shortly thereafter as 16-bit versions of themselves. All five of them run through rooms and on lanes, while also encountering and attacking Robotnik's weapons and drones.
