= List of Terminator: The Sarah Connor Chronicles episodes =

The complete first and second season DVD covers

Terminator: The Sarah Connor Chronicles is a science fiction drama series developed for the Fox Broadcasting Company by Josh Friedman. The series follows the characters of Sarah and John Connor (portrayed by Lena Headey and Thomas Dekker, respectively) after the events of Terminator 2: Judgment Day. In the pilot, the pair are transported from 1999 to 2007 by a terminator named Cameron (Summer Glau) who was sent back from 2027 to protect John. From that point, the show chronicles the trio's attempt to stop the computer system Skynet from going online, triggering a nuclear holocaust and declaring war on mankind in an apocalyptic future.

The Sarah Connor Chronicles premiered on Sunday, January 13, 2008 after the New York Giants and Dallas Cowboys playoff game at 9:00PM Eastern/8:00PM Central to the highest ratings for a scripted television program on Fox in seven years and the most viewers for a scripted show on the network in eight years. Additionally, it also had the highest ratings of a scripted program debut during prime time among adults 18–34 and 18–49 (key demographics for advertisers) in three years and the most viewers for a scripted program premiere in two years. A second episode followed the next day, Monday, in the show's regular timeslot at 9:00PM Eastern/8:00PM Central.

Due to the 2007–08 Writers Guild of America strike, only nine of the original thirteen episodes for the first season were completed.

The producers of the show announced that it was renewed for a second season, initially for only 13 episodes. The new season began airing on September 8, 2008 in the United States. On October 17, 2008 the network gave the show a full second season order, bringing the total number of season 2 episodes to 22. The series went on a brief hiatus mid-season, from December 16, 2008, to February 13, 2009. When it returned, it was scheduled with Joss Whedon's Dollhouse on Friday nights.

A total of 31 episodes of Terminator: The Sarah Connor Chronicles aired before the series was cancelled on May 18, 2009.

== Series overview ==
Season	Episodes	Originally released	
Season	Episodes	First released	Last released
1	9	January 13, 2008	March 3, 2008
2	22	September 8, 2008	April 10, 2009

== Episodes ==
=== Season 1 (2008) ===
No. overall	No. in season	Title	Directed by	Written by	Original release date	Prod. code	US viewers (millions)
1	1	"Pilot"	David Nutter	Josh Friedman	January 13, 2008	276022	18.36
Following the events of Terminator 2: Judgment Day, Sarah Connor and her son, John Connor, are wanted fugitives for their role in the Cyberdyne Systems bombing and the death of Miles Dyson. In August 1999, Sarah and John are living with paramedic Charley Dixon (Dean Winters) in Nebraska, while FBI Agent James Ellison (Richard T. Jones) is focused on tracking them down. The two move to a small town in New Mexico, where a T-888 Terminator named Cromartie (Owain Yeoman) attacks John's school. John is rescued by a reprogrammed T-900, Cameron, who informs them that Skynet activates in 2011 and Judgment Day still occurs. The trio go to Los Angeles, using a futuristic weapon to decapitate Cromartie and a time displacement device hidden in a bank vault to travel to 2007, where footage of their arrival surprises Dixon and Ellison.
2	2	"Gnothi Seauton"	David Nutter	Josh Friedman	January 14, 2008	3T6851	10.08
Three days after arriving in 2007, Cameron takes Sarah to get new identities from four resistance fighters who were also sent back. Finding three dead, one missing, and another T-888 whom the pair fight off, Sarah elects to visit old friend Enrique Salceda to obtain new IDs from his nephew Carlos. John visits Charley and discovers he is married. Sarah suspects that Salceda is a traitor but is unable to go through with killing him, so a calculating Cameron does it for her; while investigating Salceda's death, Ellison listens to a recording that proves her suspicions correct. Meanwhile, the severed head of Cromartie reactivates and reconnects to its headless body, intent on tracking John again. After Cameron reveals to Sarah that she died from cancer in 2005, a frightened Sarah gets checked by a doctor. Note: The episode title, Gnothi Seauton (Greek: γνῶθι σεαυτόν, English: "know thyself") is an ancient Greek aphorism; the English version is used in the beginning narration.
3	3	"The Turk"	Paul Edwards	John Wirth	January 21, 2008	3T6852	8.65
Sarah tracks down a new lead into the creation of Skynet, becoming romantically involved with cell phone salesman Andy Goode (Brendan Hines), who is constructing a chess-playing supercomputer named The Turk. John and Cameron attempt to remain inconspicuous in their new high school, which proves difficult when John fails to stop student Jordan Cowan (Alessandra Torresani) from committing suicide. A disguised Cromartie approaches a scientist (Adam Godley) with the mathematical formula to regenerate his destroyed human skin. After they are successful, Cromartie kills the scientist and takes his eyes. Ellison, investigating the murders of the three dead resistance fighters, is called to the scene of the doctor's murder and finds all traces of their work destroyed. Sarah burns down Andy's house to destroy The Turk.
4	4	"Heavy Metal"	Sergio Mimica Gezzan	John Enbom	February 4, 2008	3T6854	8.84
Cromartie visits a plastic surgeon and has his appearance altered to look like actor George Laszlo (Garret Dillahunt) before killing the surgeon. John, Sarah, and Cameron learn Cromartie is active in 2007 and decide to destroy a large shipment of coltan, a primary metal in the Terminator endoskeleton. John sneaks aboard a truck under the command of Carter (Brian Bloom), a T-888 that stores the coltan in a hardened bunker before deactivating. With Cameron and Sarah’s help, John is able to steal the truck, trap Carter in the bunker, and dump the coltan in the ocean. Ellison learns that the blood found at the doctor's office is synthetic in nature and brings Laszlo in for questioning; he confides his suspicions about the unusual nature of the case in fellow FBI Agent Greta Simpson (Catherine Dent), but his theories are discredited by upstart FBI Agent Stewart (Lee Thompson Young). With Laszlo no longer a suspect, Cromartie kills him and assumes his identity.
5	5	"Queen's Gambit"	Matt Earl Beesley	Natalie Chaidez	February 11, 2008	3T6853	8.34
Sarah is contacted by Andy, who tells her that he has reprogrammed his chess-playing supercomputer and is submitting it into a competition where the grand prize is a military contract. Charley and his wife Michelle (Sonya Walger) are visited by Cromartie, posing as FBI Agent Robert Kester, and Charley reveals to her that he had previously been visited by John. After Andy's computer surprisingly loses, Sarah finds him dead and The Turk missing. Upon discovering that the man arrested for Andy's murder is a resistance fighter from the future, Sarah visits him and learns he is Derek Reese (Brian Austin Green) — Kyle Reese’s older brother. While being moved, Derek's transport van is intercepted by the T-888 who attacked the resistance safehouse. Derek is shot and severely wounded by the T-888 before Cameron and John are able to remove its CPU. Ellison finds the T-888's severed hand while investigating the transport attack. Sarah informs John that Derek is his uncle; in need of immediate medical attention, John collects Charley to help save Derek's life.
6	6	"Dungeons & Dragons"	Jeffrey Hunt	Ashley Edward Miller & Zack Stentz	February 18, 2008	3T6858	8.09
In 2007, Charley is able to stabilize Derek, who fades in and out of consciousness while flashing back to his life in the future. Charley learns that Sarah has told the truth about Terminators after witnessing Cameron strip and destroy the T-888 endoskeleton with thermite, though Cameron keeps his CPU. Sarah makes Cameron promise not to kill Charley and tells John not to let Derek know about his parentage. In 2027, Derek is separated from Kyle and captured by Terminators. He and two others are part of a group tortured for information; one of the two, Billy Wisher, reveals that his real name is Andy Goode and that he played a part in creating Skynet. Derek and the prisoners are allowed to escape, learning that their base had been attacked and that Kyle is presumed missing after a highly secretive mission with John Connor. (Note: His mission to travel back in time to protect Sarah, as depicted in The Terminator) Derek meets Cameron after she destroys another reprogrammed Terminator that had reverted to its original programming and begun killing resistance fighters. Months later, Derek agrees to travel back to 2007, where he approaches Andy and kills him.
7	7	"The Demon Hand"	Charles Beeson	Toni Graphia	February 25, 2008	3T6855	7.12
Cameron and Sarah search for the missing T-888 hand and The Turk. Upon learning the hand is in Ellison's possession, Sarah discovers he also has her file from Pescadero State Hospital, where she was previously institutionalized. Cameron tracks The Turk and Andy's business partner, Dmitri Shipkov, through his sister's ballet studio. Ellison visits Dr. Peter Silberman (Bruce Davison), once Sarah's hospital psychiatrist, now a doomsday convert after witnessing the T-1000. Not believing Ellison is human, Silberman attacks Ellison and attempts to burn down his house with Ellison inside. He is stopped by Sarah, who recovers and destroys the T-888 hand, and Silberman is returned to Pescadero as a patient. Cameron protects Dmitri's sister from thugs and meets Dmitri, who reveals that he programmed The Turk to throw the chess match to sell it to another buyer. After Dmitri provides the buyer's name, Cameron allows them both to be killed by the thugs. Derek tells John that Cameron cannot be trusted, believing she may have compromised his resistance cell. John finds the Pescadero file and discovers that Sarah had signed away her parental rights; confronting her afterward, Sarah tells him the day she did that was the same day she escaped Pescadero with his help.
8	8	"Vick's Chip"	J. Miller Tobin	Daniel T. Thomsen	March 3, 2008	3T6857	7.98
John finds the T-888's chip in Cameron's possession and decides to hack into it, learning the T-888's primary mission was to impersonate Vick Chamberlain (Matt McColm) and keep his wife Barbara's traffic control system ARTIE on track at all costs, as it may become a part of Skynet's future infrastructure. Derek learns from Vick's memories that he had identified another resistance fighter and followed him back to the safehouse, exonerating Cameron. Cromartie begins a search of the area schools for new students, attempting to find John. He nearly catches him before Cameron has John's friend stand in for him, causing Cromartie to continue his search. Unable to hack into the traffic control system, John deactivates Cameron and uses her CPU to hack into the system at a control point, wreaking havoc on the system. Derek tries to get John to destroy her CPU, but he refuses; after returning home, Sarah informs him that she knows he killed Andy and she will kill him if he ever lies to her again.
9	9	"What He Beheld"	Mike Rohl	Ian Goldberg	March 3, 2008	3T6856	8.29
In a flashfoward to 2011, a teenage Derek plays baseball with Kyle when Judgment Day begins. Men with Margos Sarkissian (James Urbaniak), the businessman in possession of The Turk, kill three of Carlos Salceda's crew to get information on Sarah. At an internet cafe, Sarah and Cameron are instructed to collect $500,000 for The Turk, but after discovering their true identities, Sarkissian blackmails them for $2 million to keep their information from the FBI. Another of Carlos's associates brings them back to the internet cafe, where they kill the presumed Sarkissian and steal a computer hard drive to track down The Turk. On John's birthday, Derek brings him to a park and points out Kyle and his younger self, revealing that he has figured out that Kyle is John's father. Meeting with Charley, Ellison is able to connect the fake agent Kester and the murders of the doctors with Laszlo and Cromartie. Together with Simpson, Ellison leads an HRT team to apprehend Laszlo, resulting in Cromartie killing Simpson and 20 other FBI agents but sparing Ellison. Cameron leaves the house to get John a birthday cake; after recognizing a man walking away from the house as the owner of the internet cafe — the real Sarkissian — her car explodes.

=== Season 2 (2008–09) ===
No. overall	No. in season	Title	Directed by	Written by	Original release date	Prod. code	US viewers (millions)
10	1	"Samson and Delilah"	David Nutter	Josh Friedman	September 8, 2008	3T7301	6.34
Cameron survives the car bombing, but her CPU is damaged and reboots. As their house is set on fire, Sarah and John manage to kill Sarkissian and escape from Cameron, who is now trying to kill John. Sarah and John are wounded in a car accident and shelter in a church. After witnessing the FBI massacre, a resigned Ellison assigns the blame to Lazslo. Charley and Derek rush to the ruined house and attempt to follow Sarah and John's trail from the accident. Sarah and John prepare a trap for Cameron in the church but fail to remove her CPU; she chases them to a warehouse, where they are able to pin Cameron between two trucks and remove her CPU, despite her pleas to John to stop. Sarah and Derek prepare to destroy Cameron with thermite, but John reactivates her and she proves that her original programming has been overridden. Meanwhile, ZeiraCorp CEO Catherine Weaver (Shirley Manson) purchases The Turk and informs her department heads that she is assembling a team to study the computer in a project codenamed "Babylon." After the meeting, Weaver reveals herself to be a Terminator similar to the T-1000 and kills one of her frustrated executives.
11	2	"Automatic for the People"	Jeffrey Hunt	Natalie Chaidez	September 15, 2008	3T7302	5.49
A mortally wounded resistance fighter from the future (Zack Ward) shows up on the Connors' doorstep, warning them about the Seranno Point Nuclear Power Plant before dying. Sarah befriends an engineer at the plant named Greenway (Paul Schulze), a cancer survivor who does not believe the plant is safe to bring online in an upcoming test. Ellison meets with Charley and Michelle, urging them to leave town; his visit causes Charley to tell Michelle the truth about Sarah and the Terminators. John starts at a new school and befriends Riley (Leven Rambin), who draws Sarah's suspicions. On the day of the test, Sarah realizes that Greenway has been replaced by a T-888 when she notices his missing surgical scars; she and Cameron destroy the T-888 before it can cause a meltdown. The plant's control is transferred to an automated company revealed to be run by Weaver impersonating an executive. At home, Sarah discovers that the dying resistance fighter wrote a list of names and locations in the basement, each somehow linked to Skynet.
12	3	"The Mousetrap"	Bill Eagles	John Wirth	September 22, 2008	3T7305	5.82
Cromartie kidnaps Michelle, causing Charley to reach out to Sarah for help. Sarah and Derek travel out to the desert to help Charley, leaving Cameron to watch John, but he evades her to join Riley at the Santa Monica Pier. Ellison is approached by Weaver with proof of other Terminators and offered a job tracking them down for her company. Cromartie traps Sarah, Derek, Charley, and Michelle in the desert, bringing a cell tower down and disabling their car. The group commandeers a van to try and catch up to Cromartie until Charley realizes that Michelle was fatally injured in the tower crash. John escapes Cromartie by jumping from the pier, but Michelle dies after being rushed to the hospital.
13	4	"Allison from Palmdale"	Charles Beeson	Toni Graphia	September 29, 2008	3T7304	5.53
While shopping at a grocery store, Cameron experiences a glitch that causes her to lose her memory and uncover distant memories of interrogating the resistance fighter she was based on, Allison Young. She is arrested and meets street kid Jody (Leah Pipes), who brings her to a halfway house. Talking to the counselor, she describes more of Allison's life, which causes the counselor to contact Allison's then-pregnant mother. Ellison digs into Weaver's background, particularly about the crash that killed her husband, but ultimately accepts her job offer. As John tracks Cameron, Jody convinces her to break into a house to steal from the safe. Cameron realizes that Jody has lied to her, bringing her out of her fugue state. She incapacitates Jody as John finds her and takes her home. In 2027, Allison Young is captured and interrogated about her life and her role in the resistance by an unseen figure. Later, she escapes her cell and discovers dozens of cages with humans and animals imprisoned. She jumps from the prison, an aircraft carrier, but is quickly recaptured and comes face-to-face with her interrogator — Cameron, who tells her she is part of a faction of machines that want to end the war. Disbelieving her, Allison tells her the bracelet she wears means nothing, but Cameron deduces that they are a way to identify infiltrators and snaps Allison's neck for lying, killing her.
14	5	"Goodbye to All That"	Bryan Spicer	Ashley Edward Miller & Zack Stentz	October 6, 2008	3T7303	5.61
A T-888 tracking a resistance fighter begins indiscriminately killing Martin Bedells in the Los Angeles area. Derek and John travel to a military academy to protect a cadet Bedell (Will Rothhaar) there, while Sarah and Cameron catch up to the T-888 when it tries to kill a young boy with the name. Ellison is sent to Seranno Point to investigate the near meltdown when a T-888 eye is recovered. He meets with plant manager Nelson (Dean Norris), who shows him damage no human could have done and is convinced the plant is covering up the true cause. At the bar plant employees frequent, Ellison discovers a photo with Sarah's reflection in it; later at the same bar, Weaver impersonates a young woman to kill Nelson. Derek and John use Claymore mines and a Barrett M82 to ambush the T-888. John reveals his true identity to the T-888 to lure it to a nearby tar pit, where they use a thermite charge to destroy it. Sarah bonds with the child Bedell, helping him complete a book report before she releases him back to his parents. Leaving the academy, Derek explains Bedell's future significance: he sacrificed himself to stop a prisoner convoy, helping John, Kyle, and dozens of other resistance fighters escape.
15	6	"The Tower Is Tall but the Fall Is Short"	Tawnia McKiernan	Denise Thé	October 20, 2008	3T7308	5.34
Sarah, John, and Cameron search the office of a psychologist, Dr. Boyd Sherman (Dorian Harewood), whose name appears on the resistance fighter's list. The T-1001 Weaver takes the real Weaver's daughter, Savannah, to Sherman as well for help when she acts frightened of her mother, having noticed Weaver's change in behavior. The Connors become patients of Sherman's, who quickly notices that John exhibits PTSD tendencies he sees in war veterans; flashbacks show John is still troubled by killing Sarkissian to protect his mother, which Sarah later admits to Sherman. Derek discovers that Jesse (Stephanie Jacobsen), a resistance fighter and old lover, has gone AWOL and traveled back from the future to escape the war. Cameron destroys a Terminator sent back to kill Sherman. Weaver offers a job to Sherman working on the Babylon project, The Turk-based AI.
16	7	"Brothers of Nablus"	Milan Cheylov	Ian Goldberg	November 3, 2008	3T7306	5.16
The Connors discover their house has been robbed and their identification is missing after Riley failed to rearm the house's security system following a visit with John. Derek brings them to a fence who they eventually threaten to get the identities of the thieves. Cromartie destroys a Terminator meant to replace Ellison, who is arrested for the murder of a man the Terminator killed to steal his clothes. Disguised as a detective, Weaver discredits a witness who identified Ellison at the scene, exonerating him. Cromartie begins searching for Cameron after the halfway house scans her photo into the system. He meets Jody, who claims she can bring Cromartie to Cameron, but he leaves her when he realizes she is exaggerating her connection. On a door-to-door search, Riley is able to convince him that the Connor house is her own, throwing him off the trail. Sarah and Cameron catch up to the thieves at a bowling alley; Cameron kills three of them, while Sarah spares the last — only for Cromartie to find him and obtain Sarah's location.
17	8	"Mr. Ferguson Is Ill Today"	Michael Nankin	Daniel T. Thomsen	November 10, 2008	3T7311	5.19
After a fight with Sarah, John and Riley travel to a Mexican town that John and Sarah once lived in. John is identified in the bar, causing a scene that ends up with John and Riley in jail. Cromartie breaks into the Connor house and kidnaps Sarah, traveling to Mexico when John calls her from the jail. Derek and Cameron discover that John and Sarah are in trouble and gather weapons to pursue Cromartie, while Ellison is contacted by an old FBI colleague and informed that John has been identified. Ellison rescues John, Riley, and Sarah from Cromartie, helping them set up an ambush in a church. Derek and Sarah distract Cromartie while Cameron sneaks up with a shotgun to deliver the fatal blow. The group buries Cromartie's body while an anguished Sarah destroys his CPU.
18	9	"Complications"	Steven DePaul	Ian Goldberg & John Wirth	November 17, 2008	3T7309	5.31
Following their battle with Cromartie, a sickly Sarah is haunted by visions. She seeks Sherman's assistance deciphering them, but he is unable to help when she refuses to open up. Cameron and John travel back to Mexico to destroy Cromartie's body and discover that it is missing. They threaten Ellison, but he denies having tampered with the body. Later, Ellison brings Cromartie's body to Weaver. Jesse shows Derek that she has captured Charles Fischer (Richard Schiff), a "Gray" who collaborated with Skynet after Judgment Day. Fischer claims to be a watchmaker, but Derek realizes he is lying after finding a prison tattoo on him. Jesse brings in Fischer's younger self and Derek begins torturing him to get the older Fischer to admit the truth: he was serving a life sentence during Judgment Day and later worked with Skynet. Jesse is stunned that Derek is unable to recognize Fischer, who personally led Derek's torture. When Derek threatens to kill the younger Fischer, Jesse kills the older one. After releasing the younger Fischer, Derek theorizes that his inability to remember Fischer may be a sign that they are changing the future. The next day, the younger Fischer is arrested by the Department of Homeland Security for illegally accessing a computer database; flashbacks show the older Fischer accessed it, leading to his arrest for treason and the life sentence that ensures his survival beyond Judgment Day.
19	10	"Strange Things Happen at the One Two Point"	Scott Peters	Ashley Edward Miller & Zack Stentz	November 24, 2008	3T7310	4.62
While obsessing over three bloody dots among the resistance fighter's notes, Sarah discovers a technology company, Dakara Systems, with a logo similar to the dots. John investigates their AI, discovering it is too primitive to be The Turk. Despite mounting discrepancies between the AI and The Turk, Sarah forges ahead with attempting to purchase it and is nearly scammed out of $500,000. Derek confronts Jesse with her surveillance photos of Cameron and the Connors. Jesse informs him that in the future, John began to make questionable decisions after isolating himself and Cameron from other resistance leadership, so she seeks to end Cameron's influence over John in the past. She meets with a concerned Riley, who is revealed to be working with Jesse. Told by Jesse to continue her mission, Riley suffers a nervous breakdown, screaming at her foster mother about the future war. Ellison learns that Sherman died after a city blackout while working with John Henry, which used the building's generator power to protect itself at the cost of Sherman's life. Weaver finally allows him access to the Babylon project, where he admonishes them for failing to teach John Henry the ethics of his decision. Later, Weaver shows a horrified Ellison that John Henry has been uploaded to Cromartie's repaired body.
20	11	"Self Made Man"	Holly Dale	Toni Graphia	December 1, 2008	3T7312	5.83
In 1920, an electrical storm ignites a massive fire at a New Year's Eve party. Cameron meets Eric (Billy Lush), a librarian she has befriended. She discovers a photo from the fire, a speakeasy blaze that killed 43 people, recognizing one of the survivors as a T-888. Cameron and Eric identify the T-888 as Myron Stark (Todd Stashwick) and begin searching the library's archives for more information about him. In flashbacks, Stark funds a real estate empire by robbing banks; battles developer Rupert Chandler, whose architect son died in the speakeasy fire, to purchase a Pico Boulevard lot; and mysteriously disappears in 1927 as the highrise Pico Tower on the property is completed. Cameron deduces that Stark accidentally traveled to 1920 and his arrival inadvertently killed Chandler's son, who was originally responsible for constructing the building. Learning that the now under-renovation building will reopen with an event hosted by the Governor of California, Stark's likely target, Cameron finds him hidden in a pocket behind a wall and destroys him. However, her relentless pursuit of information in the library and her revelation that Eric's cancer has returned ends their friendship. Meanwhile, Riley invites John to a party. After he subdues the aggressive host, John and Riley discuss their upbringings and share a kiss.
21	12	"Alpine Fields"	Charles Beeson & Bryan Spicer	John Enbom	December 8, 2008	3T7307	5.21
In a remote cabin, Sarah and Cameron approach the Fields family — father David, mother Anne, and daughter Lauren — who are being tracked by a T-888. Anne admits she is pregnant after an affair with their neighbor Roger and is determined to be its target before they escape. Six months later, Derek helps a bruised Lauren triage a heavily pregnant Anne, who suffered a gunshot wound from the T-888. He recognizes Lauren as the hazmat-suited doctor who will save him in the future. Derek tells Anne that her unborn daughter, Sydney, will use her natural immunity to help cure a deadly disease in the future. Anne dies after giving birth to Sydney; Derek asks Lauren and baby Sydney to stay with them, but she disappears with the baby. In 2027, Derek leads a rescue operation into a bunker that had been attacked by a bioweapon, killing all but one of the 200 inside. Horrified at the casualties, he contemplates suicide before Jesse stops him and introduces herself. He and Jesse reenter the bunker, where they recover a teenage Sydney but are exposed to the toxin. Derek and Jesse are treated and saved by Lauren, who thanks them for safely returning her sister.
22	13	"Earthlings Welcome Here"	Félix Enríquez Alcalá	Natalie Chaidez	December 15, 2008	3T7313	5.29
Still investigating the three dots, Sarah attends a UFO convention and learns about the existence of mysterious drones built with metals similar to the Terminator endoskeleton. She meets Eileen (Dinah Lenney), a blogger tracking the drone and a former engineer on the top-secret project. After Eileen and Sarah are attacked while trying to recover a metal sample, Sarah encourages her to meet with a hypnotherapist to locate the factory where she once worked. Eileen and the therapist are both murdered during the session, but Sarah is able to use a recording to find the remote factory; she is forced to kill a security guard who shoots and wounds her. Outside the factory, she watches the drone prototype hover over her. Meanwhile, Weaver convinces Ellison to take over teaching John Henry, so he lectures the AI on ethics and religion. In 2027, Jesse meets Riley as she scavenges for food underground. They travel to 2007, where Jesse sends her to school to make contact with John. Riley surprises Jesse at her hotel room, explaining that she has been kicked out of her foster home for her outburst. Riley offers a new plan to salvage the situation, but she is slapped and ordered to keep John away from Cameron. John discovers a bruise on her head after the slap, which raises Cameron's suspicions. Later, John and Cameron find Riley has attempted suicide in the bathroom.
23	14	"The Good Wound"	Jeff Woolnough	Ashley Edward Miller & Zack Stentz	February 13, 2009	3T7314	3.52
Following her gunshot wound at the factory, Sarah wakes in a local hospital and is guided out by the image of Kyle Reese (Jonathan Jackson). Sarah contacts Derek — at the hospital with John following Riley’s suicide attempt — and asks him to destroy her vehicle to cover up the evidence of her involvement. Sarah abducts a doctor, Felicia Burnett (Laura Regan), to remove the bullet, leading Felicia to believe that she was shot by an abusive husband. Jesse sneaks Riley out of the hospital; Riley explains that her suicide attempt was to get closer to John after learning of his reaction to Jordan Cowan’s death, apparently satisfying Jesse. Ellison meets with John Henry, who has discovered Cromartie's past by searching the internet for Ellison. Later, Weaver meets with John Henry, who tells her he knows she is a machine. He shares an unsecured recording of workers discussing coltan at the factory Sarah found, but she refuses to tell him her plans. Weaver massacres the factory employees and destroys the building. Derek and Sarah are trailed by the local sheriff, who finds Sarah's recorder before Derek can destroy her vehicle. Derek and the sheriff catch up to Felicia and Sarah in the hospital morgue, where Felicia has removed the bullet from Sarah's leg. In a Mexican standoff with Derek and the sheriff, Felicia shoots the sheriff — her own abusive lover — and allows Derek and Sarah to escape.
24	15	"Desert Cantos"	J. Miller Tobin	Ian Goldberg & John Wirth	February 20, 2009	3T7315	3.84
The Connors attend the funeral for the 32 employees killed in Weaver's massacre, with Sarah coming face-to-face with the widow of the man she killed. Weaver sends her associate Walsh, who previously purchased The Turk for her, to track down and kill a missing employee presumed dead in the explosion. John learns from Zoe McCarthy (Alanna Masterson), daughter of one of the dead employees, that another family from town mysteriously disappeared recently; she also shows him a pasture of dead cows. After John notices an inconsistency in Zoe's story about her father George, he and Cameron deduce that she is lying about his death. Sarah tails Walsh to a house, finding a secure bunker underneath that leads to the McCarthy garage. Cameron finds CCTV footage showing that George and the man Sarah killed murdered the missing family, while John discovers muddy boots that point to the location of the dead cows. There, they find Walsh dead and witness the drone launching, which flies to a trailer driven away by George.
25	16	"Some Must Watch, While Some Must Sleep"	Scott Lautanen	Natalie Chaidez & Denise Thé	February 27, 2009	3T7316	3.42
Haunted by nightmares of Ed Winston (Ned Bellamy), the guard she killed in the factory, an insomnia-driven Sarah attempts to break into a tool company that did business with the warehouse, but she is tased by a masked figure. She awakes at a sleep clinic and is met by John, who tells her she went two weeks without sleep and injured herself in a fall down the stairs. Coming to in a van, Sarah discovers the man who tased her is Winston, who claims to have survived his gunshot wound. Winston handcuffs Sarah and attempts to drug her, but she fights him off and he is inadvertently drugged. At the clinic, Sarah confides to John her suspicions about the clinic and her flashes of the van, which she believes are vivid dreams. Sarah offers Winston her help in escaping the company and his handlers, but he double-crosses her and learns that Sarah's accomplice is John. Sarah and John discover that the clinic is scanning and mapping patient brains. Believing that Skynet is involved, Sarah confronts the nurse, who kills her and John — snapping her out of the dream world back into reality, where she finds herself bound in the back of the van. Sarah escapes her restraints and kills Winston with a shot to the head.
26	17	"Ourselves Alone"	Jeff Woolnough	Toni Graphia & Daniel T. Thomsen	March 6, 2009	3T7317	2.96
Cameron begins to suffer involuntary reflexes, leading her and John to suspect she still has latent damage from the car bombing. Derek shares the date of Judgment Day with Jesse to see if they are from different futures, but she declines to answer. Riley returns to the Connor household after her suicide attempt and notices Cameron working on her arm. Cameron shows John a box of parts from destroyed Terminators for repairs. Riley meets with Jesse, worried that Cameron is going to kill her over what she witnessed. Sarah meets Riley's foster father, who tells her that Riley talked about the future war and informs her about a guidance counselor who has met with them — revealed to be a disguised Jesse, who visits Sarah and unnerves her with the level of detail about John that Riley has told her. Confronted by John, Riley denies giving any information to anyone else. When a child services investigator arrives at the door asking about Riley, Cameron believes Riley issued the complaint. John's intervention prevents Cameron from killing her. Riley realizes Jesse's true plan was to force Cameron to kill her to drive John away, resulting in a brutal fight between her and Jesse that ends with Jesse shooting and killing Riley. Cameron gives John an explosive detonator to destroy her CPU in the event she attempts to kill him again.
27	18	"Today Is the Day, Part 1"	Guy Norman Bee	Ashley Edward Miller & Zack Stentz	March 13, 2009	3T7318	3.50
Sarah learns from Kacy that Riley's body has been discovered; she tells John and immediately suspects Cameron's involvement. Derek rescues Jesse from a bar fight and she hides the details of Riley's death from him. John Henry leads Weaver's daughter Savannah to him and they bond over hide and seek. Ellison and Weaver solve John Henry's riddle and find Savannah, though Ellison is frustrated by Weaver's indifference to the game and admonishes John Henry for putting Savannah in danger. John and Cameron trick Riley's foster father into believing she is still alive by having Cameron impersonate her over the phone, but he is angered by Cameron going off-script and telling John she loves him. While saying goodbye to Riley at the morgue, John finds defensive wounds on her hands. In 2027, Jesse prepares for a mission on the USS Jimmy Carter as Derek says goodbye, telling her he’s leaving for a crucial mission and likely will not return. He urges her to kill Queeg (Chad L. Coleman), the reprogrammed Terminator piloting the Carter, when she has the chance. Jesse discovers that Queeg has piloted the submarine off-course and asks Queeg for an explanation; he informs her that they have been directed by John Connor to retrieve a package from an oil rig near Indonesia. On it, two T-800 endoskeletons and a T-600 deliver the package.
28	19	"Today Is the Day, Part 2"	Guy Norman Bee	Ashley Edward Miller & Zack Stentz	March 20, 2009	3T7321	3.65
John discusses his doubts that Cameron killed Riley with Derek. After hours, John Henry searches ZeiraCorp's systems and shows Weaver he has discovered suspicious resignation letters from missing former company executives and an unfiled one for Ellison. John surprises Jesse at her hotel room, explaining that he realized that Riley knew his true identity when she put herself in harm's way to protect him, which led him to Jesse. He allows Jesse to leave; she meets Derek outside, who has determined that she is not the Jesse from his timeline. She flees as Derek aims at her, her fate ambiguous. In 2027, the increasingly paranoid submarine crew opens the package from the oil rig, revealing a T-1001 within. The T-1001 kills a member of the crew and escapes into the submarine's ventilation system. In the mess hall, Dietze (Theo Rossi) accuses another crewmember of being the T-1001. When Jesse stops him, Dietze and the crew beat her, but Queeg intervenes and kills Dietze. Jesse demands Queeg tell her what their mission is. When he refuses, she kills him with a plasma rifle. Jesse decides to scuttle the submarine to stop the T-1001; it appears, informing her "tell John Connor the answer is no" before it escapes. Jesse is later questioned by Cameron about the T-1001. Jesse gives its answer to Cameron, who explains the question was "will you join us?" She also tells Jesse she was pregnant during the mission but miscarried.
29	20	"To the Lighthouse"	Guy Ferland	Natalie Chaidez	March 27, 2009	3T7319	3.83
While making final plans to move, Cameron tells Derek about Jesse's miscarriage on the Jimmy Carter. Sarah brings John to a lighthouse — and Charley. John Henry is hacked and attempts to remove The Turk from the Babylon server farm before he is shut down. After he is rebooted, John Henry tells Weaver and Ellison that there is another AI like him out there. Sarah confides in Charley that she has found a lump on her breast and believes it is the cancer that killed her in the original timeline. She visits a doctor who examines the lump, finding it is not a tumor but a piece of metal — a transmitter implanted in Sarah by Winston. Sarah uses a defibrillator to short the transmitter, but mercenaries simultaneously attack her, Cameron and Derek, and Charley and John. John Henry explains to Weaver and Ellison that an advanced, intelligent AI attempted to take control of him via a computer worm, one that he has found in many operating systems worldwide. After he describes the AI as a "brother" to him, he shows them an ASCII image hidden in the code depicting the Cyberdyne Systems logo and Miles Dyson's name. Derek is kidnapped by the mercenaries, so Cameron gives chase and is temporarily incapacitated by an electric shock. She reactivates before one of the mercenaries can act on a diagram given to them by the mastermind's "brother" and remove her CPU. Charley defends John at the lighthouse while John escapes on a boat. Arriving in the aftermath, Sarah finds Charley's dead body floating in the water.
30	21	"Adam Raised a Cain"	Charles Beeson	Toni Graphia	April 3, 2009	3T7320	3.35
Meeting at Kyle Reese's gravesite, John shows the group a photo of Savannah on a cellphone from one of the lighthouse attackers, causing them to realize she may be their next target. John Henry, who has begun communicating with Savannah outside ZeiraCorp's headquarters, contacts her when a T-888 shows up at the Weaver household. He attempts to guide Savannah to safety as the Connors arrive and collect her; Derek is shot and killed by the T-888, which escapes after Cameron tosses him from the property. John Henry recognizes the Connors from the home's security footage and shows it to Ellison, who asks the AI to keep it hidden from Weaver. Sarah agrees to hand over Savannah to Ellison if Weaver will meet with her. John figures out that ZeiraCorp has used Cromartie to develop the John Henry AI program after listening to Savannah describe him. An LAPD detective informs Ellison that they have identified Derek as the wanted fugitive from Andy Goode's murder. Sarah hands off Savannah to Ellison at a movie theater and is promptly arrested by police. Derek's ashes are interred in the same cemetery as Kyle.
31	22	"Born to Run"	Jeffrey Hunt	Josh Friedman	April 10, 2009	3T7322	3.60
Sarah is questioned by FBI Agent Auldridge (Joshua Malina) about John; she lies and tells him that John died in 1999. Weaver requests to meet with John and Cameron. John and Cameron are visited by an old associate with fresh passports and a message from Sarah to leave her behind. Ellison meets with John and Cameron, asking her "will you join us?" Auldridge again makes a plea to Sarah for John's whereabouts, claiming he now believes her story after hearing from multiple people who knew them over the years. The T-888, hunting for John, is stopped and electrocuted to death by Weaver. Assisted by John Henry, Cameron breaks Sarah out of the Los Angeles County Jail. At ZeiraCorp, John tells Sarah he loves her before he and Sarah meet with Ellison and Weaver. Cameron searches for John Henry in the basement; upon finding John Henry, he too asks her "will you join us?" The meeting is interrupted by a kamikaze strike from the drone prototype; Weaver reveals herself as a T-1001 to protect the group. Rushing to the basement, they find Cameron deactivated and John Henry missing. John also discovers her chip is missing and a looping note from her apologizing. Sarah accuses Weaver of trying to create Skynet, but she explains John Henry was created to combat Skynet. Weaver activates a time displacement device in John Henry's room to follow him to the future. Ellison and Sarah decline to join Weaver, but John agrees; Sarah promises John she will stop Skynet. Arriving in the future, Weaver slips away as John meets Derek, Kyle, and Allison Young, who do not recognize him or his name. At John's landing point in the future, Sarah's last message to him is heard: "I love you too."
