= Brad Fiedel =

American composer (born 1951)

- Born: Bradley Ira Fiedel; March 10, 1951 (age 75); New York City, U.S.
- Genres: Electronic, new wave, synthpop, film score, dance
- Occupation: Composer
- Years active: 1973–present
- Spouse: Ann Dusenberry (m. 1993)
- Website: bradfiedel.net

Bradley Ira Fiedel (born March 10, 1951) is an American composer. He has written for film and television and has collaborated with James Cameron on The Terminator (1984), Terminator 2: Judgment Day (1991) and True Lies (1994). On these scores he mostly used synthesizers, but composed a number of scores utilizing various acoustic instruments, including full orchestra.

Fiedel's work includes other films in the genres of science fiction, action and horror, such as Fright Night (1985) and sequel Fright Night Part 2 (1988), The Serpent and the Rainbow (1988) and Johnny Mnemonic (1995). He also scored a number of comedy films, such as Compromising Positions (1985) and Fraternity Vacation (1985), as well as drama films including The Accused (1988), Blue Steel (1990) and Rasputin: Dark Servant of Destiny (1996).

Fiedel retired from scoring films in the late 1990s to focus on writing musicals.

== Early life ==
Raised in Bayville, New York on Long Island, Fiedel graduated from The Barlow School. His father's family was Jewish.

== Career ==
In the early 1970s, Fiedel was signed as a songwriter to Paul Simon's DeShufflin' Music. In 1973, he spent six months as the keyboardist for Hall & Oates.

Fiedel began his career in film in the mid-1970s and wrote extensively for television films including Playing for Time written by Arthur Miller, starring Vanessa Redgrave and Jane Alexander, and some independent cinema releases, until director James Cameron hired him to score the science fiction film The Terminator in 1984, setting the wheels in motion for a successful career.

Since then, Fiedel has scored many popular and successful movies, including Fright Night (1985) and its sequel Fright Night Part 2 (1988), The Big Easy (1987), The Serpent and the Rainbow (1988), The Accused (1988), Blue Steel (1990), Terminator 2: Judgment Day (1991), Blink (1994), and True Lies (1994). He also composed the Lightstorm Entertainment logo jingle.

Fiedel's last major theatrical score was in 1995. In 2020 he released an audio version of his original musical, Full Circle.

== Personal life ==
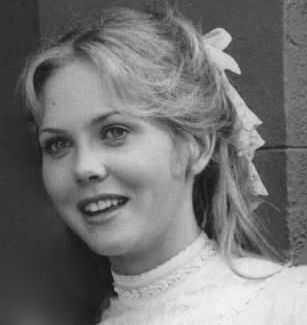
Ann Dusenberry in 1976

Fiedel has been married to actress Ann Dusenberry since 1993. The couple have two daughters named Alixandra and Zoe. They live in Santa Barbara, California.

== Filmography ==
- Apple Pie (1975)
- Deadly Hero (1975)
- Damien’s Island (1976)
- Looking Up (1977)
- Mayflower: The Pilgrims' Adventure (1979, TV movie)
- Hardhat and Legs (1979)
- The Day the Women Got Even (1980, TV movie)
- Playing for Time (1980, TV movie)
- Dream House (1981, TV movie)
- The Bunker (1981, CBS TV movie)
- Night School (1981)
- Just Before Dawn (1981)
- Mae West (1982, TV movie)
- Dreams Don’t Die (1982, TV movie)
- Born Beautiful (1982, TV movie)
- Murder in Coweta County (1983, TV movie)
- Cocaine: One Man's Seduction (1983, TV movie)
- Eyes of Fire (1983)
- Right of Way (1983, TV movie)
- Jacobo Timerman: Prisoner Without a Name, Cell Without a Number (1983, TV movie)
- Girls of the White Orchid (1983, TV movie)
- Heart of Steel (1983, TV movie)
- When She Says No (1984, TV movie)
- Anatomy Of An Illness (1984, TV movie)
- The Baron and the Kid (1984, TV movie)
- Children in the Crossfire (1984, TV movie)
- The Three Wishes of Billy Grier (1984, TV movie)
- Calendar Girl Murders (1984, TV movie)
- The Terminator (1984)
- Fraternity Vacation (1985)
- Fright Night (1985)
- Compromising Positions (1985)
- The Midnight Hour (1985)
- Deadly Messages (1985, TV movie)
- Into Thin Air (1985, TV movie)
- Popeye Doyle (1986, TV movie)
- Desert Bloom (1986)
- Let's Get Harry (1986)
- The Big Easy (1986)
- Under Siege (1986, TV movie)
- The Brotherhood of Justice (1986, TV movie)
- Second Serve (1986, TV movie)
- Of Pure Blood (1986, TV movie)
- Nowhere to Hide (1987)
- Weekend War (1987, TV movie)
- The Last Innocent Man (1987, TV movie)
- Bluffing It (1987, TV movie)
- Right to Die (1987, TV movie)
- The Serpent and the Rainbow (1988)
- Fright Night Part 2 (1988)
- The Accused (1988)
- Hostage (1988, TV movie)
- Hot Paint (1988, TV movie)
- Bluffing It (1988, TV movie)
- Perfect Witness (1989, TV movie)
- True Believer (1989)
- Immediate Family (1989)
- Cold Sassy Tree (1989, TV movie)
- Blue Steel (1990)
- Night Visions (1990, TV movie)
- Forgotten Prisoners: The Amnesty Files (1990, TV movie)
- Plymouth (1991)
- Blood Ties (1991, TV movie)
- Terminator 2: Judgment Day (1991)
- Teamster Boss: The Jackie Presser Story (1992)
- Gladiator (1992)
- Straight Talk (1992)
- The Real McCoy (1993)
- Striking Distance (1993)
- Blink (1993)
- True Lies (1994)
- Johnny Mnemonic (1995)
- Eden (1996)
- Rasputin: Dark Servant of Destiny (1996)
- Mistrial (1996, TV movie)
- Eden (1999)
- Y2K (1999)
