= Catherine Weaver =

Catherine Weaver / T-1001
- Terminator: The Sarah Connor Chronicles character
- The T-1001, masquerading as Catherine Weaver in her office
- First appearance: "Samson and Delilah" (2008)
- Last appearance: "Born to Run" (2009)
- Created by: Josh Friedman
- Portrayed by: Shirley Manson

In-universe information
- Alias: Catherine Weaver
- Manufacturer: Skynet
- Model: T-1001

Catherine Weaver is a fictional character in the television series Terminator: The Sarah Connor Chronicles, which aired on Fox from 2008 to 2009. The character, portrayed by singer Shirley Manson, recurs throughout the second and final season, debuting in its premiere episode.

Weaver is a Terminator, a fictional line of androids featured throughout the eponymous franchise. She is identified off-screen as a T-1001. Like the T-1000, she is made of a liquid metal which allows her to shapeshift into other people or objects. These effects were achieved through computer-generated imagery, created by Entity FX.

In the series, the character has taken the place of Catherine Weaver, the co-founder of ZeiraCorp who died some time prior to the season's events. Under her new identity, the Terminator becomes CEO and commences development of an artificial intelligence, later known as John Henry.

The character marked Manson's acting debut. She had grown tired of musical performing and took on acting as a new challenge, though she initially knew little about her character's intentions, and was surprised at how large the role turned out to be. Manson found that portraying a machine was harder than expected, and was initially overwhelmed in her new role, but ultimately enjoyed the experience. Her acting received a mixed reception.

== Character overview ==
=== Abilities ===
The character is a Terminator, identified off-screen as a T-1001. Commonly known as Catherine Weaver, she is made of a liquid metal, allowing her to shapeshift into other people. Her human name comes from the woman who she most frequently impersonates. In addition to copying humans' appearances, she can mimic their voices as well, although she has trouble expressing natural dialogue and human emotions, regardless of who she is impersonating. Besides people, she can also morph into various objects, for instance turning her arms into bladed weapons. A portion of her body is disguised as an eel and kept in a fish tank at her office.

Weaver shares her mimicking abilities with the T-1000, who appears in the film Terminator 2: Judgment Day (1991). Shirley Manson, who portrays Weaver, said of the two characters that "it's almost like an upgrade from one television set to the other." Stunt coordinator Joel Kramer said of Weaver, "She's the same liquid metal model, basically. She can morph into whatever she wants, to a point. Any inanimate object as long as there are no moving parts."

=== Background story ===
Terminator: The Sarah Connor Chronicles is set around 2008. (Note: In the pilot episode, the storyline shifts from 1999 to 2007 via time travel. From there on, the story gradually progresses to 2009.) Before the T-1001's arrival from the future, Catherine Weaver and her husband Lachlan had founded ZeiraCorp, a technology company. Lachlan, a helicopter pilot, publicly died in a 2005 crash, and Catherine died around the same time, both events occurring off-screen. However, Catherine continued to live on through the T-1001, which copied her appearance and replaced Lachlan as CEO of ZeiraCorp. The T-1001 (commonly known as Weaver) uses this position to pursue her goal of developing an artificial intelligence.

The Weavers left behind a young daughter named Savannah, now raised by the Catherine Weaver doppelganger, who struggles with human emotions and interaction. Savannah is unaware that her mother is now a machine, although she does notice a change in her behavior after Lachlan's death. The new Weaver is initially unsure of how to parent Savannah, who seems frightened and uncomfortable around her.

In 2027, humans are led by John Connor in a war against machines. The latter are led by Skynet, an artificial intelligence that launched a nuclear attack on humanity in 2011, an event known as Judgment Day. Several episodes include segments set during the future war. In a two-part episode, Jesse Flores and other human resistance fighters are sent to retrieve a package in Skynet territory, purportedly for John. However, they question the mission and the contents of the package. They open it to investigate and wind up unleashing the T-1001. The machine tells Jesse to relay a message: "Tell John Connor the answer is no." Cameron, a reprogrammed Terminator who is John's closest ally, later informs Jesse that the T-1001 had been asked, "Will you join us?"

Later, Cameron travels back in time to protect teenage John and his mother, Sarah Connor. The trio work to prevent Judgment Day; Weaver seems unaware of their existence for much of the series, and vice versa.

=== Season two ===
As the second season begins, the Weaver doppelganger acquires the Turk, an advanced computer created by the late Andy Goode. She diverts company resources to develop an artificial intelligence known as Babylon, using the Turk as a starting point. As part of the project, she also recruits FBI agent James Ellison to find and capture a Terminator for research, while suggesting to him that one was responsible for Lachlan's crash. Until the series finale, Ellison is unaware that Weaver is a machine. On several occasions, she secretly uses her shapeshifting ability to impersonate other people and further her goals. For instance, she briefly takes on a new identity as a business executive and purchases several nuclear power plants, one of which will later be used by the human resistance as a base.

Early in the season, unsure of what to do with Savannah, Weaver takes her to see Dr. Boyd Sherman, a family psychologist. Savannah confides that she misses her "old mommy", and Sherman relays this to Weaver, believing the latter has become emotionally withdrawn as a result of Lachlan's death. Weaver then makes an effort to learn more about her human counterpart, to improve her impersonation and parenting.

The developing Babylon A.I. is deemed to have the mind of a young child, and Weaver soon hires Sherman as a consultant, believing him ideal to teach it. Cromartie, a T-888 sent from the future to kill John, is eventually disabled by the Connors. Ellison later retrieves the body and delivers it to Weaver. Meanwhile, Sherman renames the A.I. project "John Henry", after the folklore character. Some time later, a power outage traps Sherman in the ZeiraCorp basement, where John Henry is located. The A.I., in control of the building's electrical systems, redirects power and ventilation for its mainframe. John Henry shows no remorse upon learning that these actions inadvertently led to Sherman dying of heat exposure.

Weaver has Cromartie's body hooked up to John Henry as a physical embodiment. She also convinces Ellison, a religious man, to replace Sherman and teach John Henry morals and the value of human life. Weaver views John Henry as a second child, later calling him "our boy" when talking with Ellison. John Henry, though still confined to the basement, is connected to the Internet and begins learning at a rapid rate. The A.I. quickly identifies Weaver as a machine, but obeys her instruction not to tell anyone, stating that everything she does is for his benefit. She proceeds to massacre employees at a warehouse and then destroys it with explosives. The facility had been operated by the Kaliba Group, which is connected to Skynet.

Later, John Henry is temporarily hacked by Skynet, and he soon wishes to learn more about his counterpart. In the series finale, Weaver sends Ellison to ask Cameron the same question posed in 2027: "Will you join us?" Although Cameron denies having knowledge of what this means, she is visibly upset and orders Ellison to leave. Sarah and John, who suspect that Weaver is building Skynet, go with Ellison to meet her at ZeiraCorp. They soon discover Weaver's true nature when she uses her shapeshifting abilities to form a shield, protecting them from a flying enemy drone. Weaver reveals to the Connors that they actually share a common enemy in Skynet, which John is destined to fight with the help of John Henry. The group soon learn that John Henry has traveled to the future, having gained full mobility with Cameron's CPU chip; though she had been sent to kill John Henry, she instead voluntarily gave him the chip.

Weaver and John jump forward in time to find John Henry; Sarah and Ellison decline to go with them, and Weaver instructs the latter to pick up Savannah from her gymnastics class. John and Weaver arrive in a post-Judgment Day future in which he is not known to the human resistance. Although they arrive naked, (Note: As established in the first film, the franchise's time-travel mechanics are only capable of transporting organic matter.) Weaver forms clothing a moment later. After briefly talking to John, Weaver retreats as the resistance approaches, leaving her whereabouts unknown.

== Production background ==
Terminator: The Sarah Connor Chronicles was created by Josh Friedman. It was produced by Warner Bros. Television and aired on Fox.

=== Casting and portrayal ===
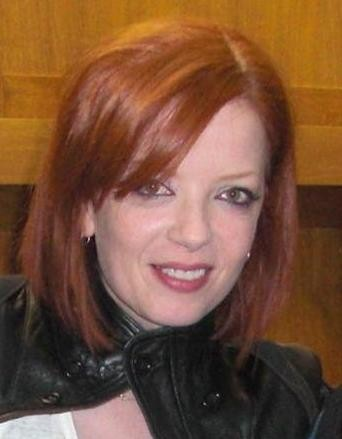
Shirley Manson, seen in 2009, was cast as Catherine Weaver

Shirley Manson, the lead singer in the rock band Garbage, was cast as Catherine Weaver in May 2008, while the band was on hiatus. Actress Sigourney Weaver was initially envisioned in the role, inspiring the character's surname. Outside of music videos, Manson had never acted before, and her casting was met with skepticism. She had wanted to act for years, but up to that point had never found a project interesting enough for her to sign on.

Manson was friends with Friedman's wife, who told Manson that he was interested in casting her as a Terminator, the only role she would be interested in playing. Manson did not realize it would be a recurring role, instead expecting it to consist of a fight scene with another character. As a fan of the first two Terminator films, she agreed to try out for the role: "It was a trigger response because I'm a big Terminator fan. I auditioned the next day and got the part before I really understood the full implications of what I'd gotten myself into."

Between 50 and 100 women had auditioned for the role, with Manson and two actresses becoming finalists. The three women auditioned for the head of Warner Bros., who was unimpressed with Manson and became quickly convinced that she would not get the role. Manson and Friedman were also in agreement that she gave a "terrible" performance. However, because of her status as a rock star, the head of Fox wanted to meet with her during a second round of auditions, this time for the network. After Friedman had a motivational talk with Manson, she arrived to the second audition and gave a commanding performance which got her the role.

Initially, Manson only had the script to the season premiere, and knew little about the character: "I wasn't told where she would go and I didn't know what she was there for, which is kind of hard – particularly for an inexperienced actor." The writers themselves had yet to determine the character's full storyline. Manson gradually learned more about Weaver and her intentions as filming progressed. Savannah Weaver is introduced several episodes into the season, and this helped Manson to better understand her character. She would later be surprised by how big of a role Weaver had in the show.

Initially, Weaver is suggested to the audience as an antagonist trying to build Skynet. Friedman sought to avoid a stereotypical portrayal by making the character a Terminator: "I didn't want to do just the basic evil corporate type." Speaking of Weaver's affiliation with Skynet, Friedman said that she came from a moderate faction of the A.I. that sought alternative solutions to the future war. However, the dissenting group's proposals, such as a human alliance, eventually led to infighting.

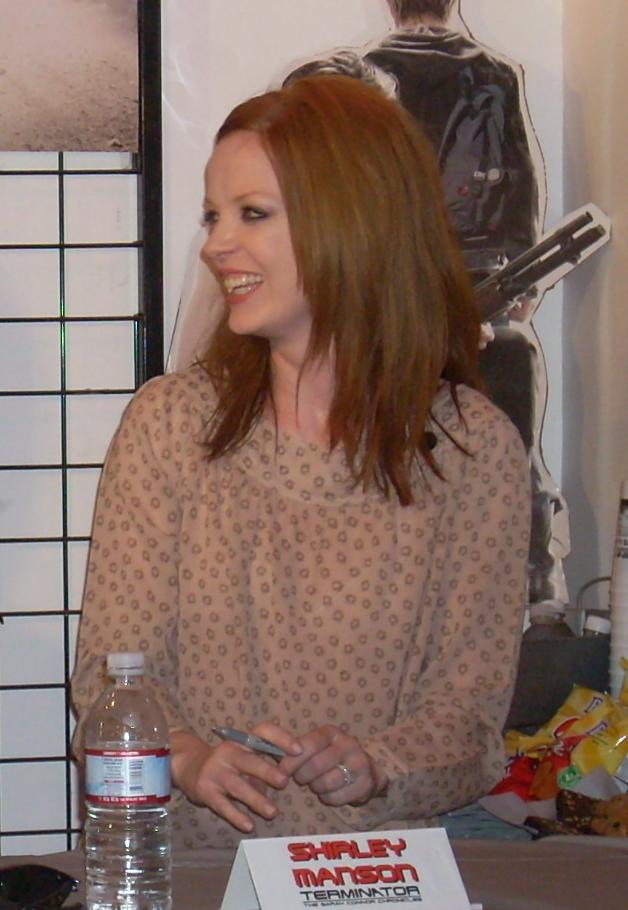
Manson at a promotional event for the show

Manson had become "too comfortable" with musical performing and took on acting as a new challenge. She was initially nervous and overwhelmed in her new role, lacking confidence in herself, while occasional last-minute script changes contributed to her uneasiness. Nevertheless, Manson called the experience enjoyable. She found the gradual unveiling of her character and backstory to be beneficial in retrospect, as it reduced pressure on her by concealing the importance of the role early on. She also felt that her past experience with music videos helped prepare her for acting as far as "where the camera is and how some of the actual technicalities work and so on".

Manson believed that audiences had a preconceived view of her as a beginning actor: "I realized that I was opening myself up for a lot of criticism and I knew, myself, that my work wasn't perfect." Manson had significant screentime with Richard T. Jones (Ellison) and Garret Dillahunt (John Henry), who both offered acting tips and support. Her portrayal was inspired by the character Patty Hewes in the series Damages, and by British prime minister Margaret Thatcher, both of whom she viewed as powerful women. Manson described Weaver as "a very subversive" and "incredibly self-assured, empowered" character in a male corporate environment, making her "a scary individual" as a result.

She found that portraying a machine was harder than expected: "They're very economical with their movements and undemonstrative as possible, which as a musician is challenging." She modeled her robotic acting on the performances of Terminator film actors Arnold Schwarzenegger (T-800) and Robert Patrick (T-1000), and said of her own character, "I wanted to bring a sort of silliness to her and that was a deliberate choice of mine. Whether you love it or hate it, that was my choice". Weaver (the human and thus the machine doppelganger) was written as Scottish, incorporating Manson's real-life accent like the films did with Schwarzenegger's Terminator. In one episode, Manson briefly portrays the human Catherine Weaver through an old interview alongside Lachlan, marking their only appearance on the show. The scene had to be shot a second time after the original footage was lost.

The second season aired from 2008 to 2009. It ran for 22 episodes, with Manson appearing in 17. The series was not renewed for a third season. As of 2021, Manson had not seen the show since its initial airing but called her character a "dream role".

=== Terminator reveal and effects ===
Weaver is revealed to the audience as a Terminator in her first episode, when she takes the form of a urinal to eavesdrop on two employees, Mr. Murch and Mr. Tuck; the latter disagrees with her decision to divert his department's resources to her A.I. project. After Murch leaves, Tuck mutters to himself that Weaver is a bitch. She then reveals herself and forms a blade out of her finger, which she uses to kill him. Manson enjoyed the scene, and said that Friedman found it amusing as "every man's nightmare, sort of a male bastion, if you like, of security in the urinal. I think he liked the idea of a woman who had already irritated this particular man being able to infiltrate somewhere where he felt he was very safe." Friedman denied that Weaver's reveal as a Terminator came sooner than initially planned. The word "Terminator" is uttered only once in the show, when Sarah learns for herself that Weaver is a machine and accuses her of building Skynet, calling her a "lying Terminator bitch."

Weaver's shapeshifting effects were achieved through computer-generated imagery (CGI), created by Entity FX. The effects crew studied the T-1000's shapeshifting abilities in Terminator 2 as a reference. Although such effects had come down in cost over the years, they were still time-consuming. Particular attention was paid to the urinal scene, as it marked the first shapeshifting effects for the show. Entity's senior visual effects supervisor, Mat Beck, said the crew "tried various paths which looked more or less believable, or even comic. It took some experimentation to adjust the details of when and where her head appears."

A 360-degree scan of Manson's face and body was conducted to create a digital version of Weaver, used for the character's full-body transformations. Manson would act out her dialogue in such instances, while the digital effects would be added later in post-production. CGI was used for the sequence in which Weaver slaughters employees at the Kaliba warehouse, using her arms as blades. Manson acted out the scene with real actors standing in as Weaver's victims, while CGI blades were superimposed over her arms in post-production.

== Reception ==
=== Critical response ===
Manson's acting received a mixed reception. Alan Sepinwall of The Star-Ledger, reviewing the season premiere, wrote that she "has an interesting visual presence, but she's not much of an actress yet." He added that Manson's most prominent scene, involving the urinal, is "unintentionally funny". Sepinwall was later disappointed that Weaver and the Connors do not meet until the finale, calling it one of many creative mistakes made by Friedman during the second season.

Travis Fickett of IGN, reviewing the premiere, wrote that Manson "doesn't quite fit yet. She's not bad, but she doesn't seem comfortable in the role. Or perhaps it's the writers who don't feel comfortable with the character yet. Whatever the case it seems strange to give her a Jetsons wardrobe and hairdo. In a show that is very grounded, Manson seems out of place and more over the top than the rest of the characters." As an example, he cited Weaver's Terminator reveal in the bathroom, a scene that "feels a bit squandered" and "could have come off better".

Five episodes into the season, Fickett found Weaver's storyline to be sluggish and tonally incompatible with the show. He added: "If we never see Weaver standing in her office, her back to Ellison as she says cryptic things – that will be too soon. It might be time to declare that Weaver just doesn't work. It's not necessarily that Shirley Manson doesn't work in the role – but the role itself doesn't seem to be going anywhere." As the season progressed, Fickett praised the character for becoming "more overtly 'robotic' and evil – as opposed to her constant and cryptic speechifying." He ultimately praised Weaver as a "fascinating" character who "seemed something more than a machine." He also praised the show for capitalizing on Manson's "somewhat otherworldly look".

Early in the season, Zack Handlen of The A.V. Club called Manson a "terrible actress", but partially changed his position upon airing of a subsequent episode: "At the very least, she finally gets something to do beyond make snide comments and fail to be menacing." Handlen said of the episode, which introduces Dr. Sherman: "It's hilarious, creepy, and a little sad, watching Weaver try to impress both her 'adopted' child and Sherman with her learned humanity." Billy Grifter, writing for Den of Geek, wrote that Weaver's "reactions to the child and therapist are perfect examples of the limitations of her programming, and of their inability to blend with humanity perfectly." He stated that scenes between the machine and Savannah "are always chilling", a view shared by Gem Seddon of Inverse, who later called them "some of the most shuddering sequences in the whole series".

Handlen found the machine characters, including Weaver, to be the show's most compelling aspect. Regarding her attempt to express sympathy about the late Lachlan Weaver, Handlen wrote that "watching something without emotion trying to puzzle its way through grief is entertaining". Ryan Keefer of DVD Talk noted that a Terminator "hasn't been placed in a truly maternal role before", and found Manson to be a "capable actress", writing that her role "as an emotionless being trying to figure out how to be a mother is one of the season's better performances".

About halfway through the season, Doug Norrie of CinemaBlend expressed uncertainty about whether Manson was the best or worst actress on the show: "She seems so robotic and creepy which makes me think she is awesome. But she is so robotic and creepy that maybe she just stinks. I don’t know." SFX subsequently wrote, "If there was one failsafe role a pop-star could be trusted not to screw up it should be the emotionless, expressionless killing machines of the Terminator franchise. But somehow Shirley Manson manages to make even a metal machine feel wooden." Manson said of her character and performance, "I had to make her seem ridiculously awkward and not human, and of course people automatically assumed that's not a deliberate choice." Manson believed that her brief performance as the human Catherine Weaver "helped people realize that I wasn't a complete imbecile and totally talentless."

In a retrospective look at the series, Matt Fowler of IGN wrote in 2015 that Manson's addition was one of the show's best aspects, offering praise for her "striking presence" and writing that she helped the show stand out better.

=== Character analysis ===
Cynthia Fuchs, an associate professor at George Mason University, wrote in 2008 that Manson brings "exactly the sort of shiny coolness that she perfected as the vocalist for Garbage", and called Weaver "visibly malevolent in her crisp white future-suit and frighteningly sculpted red hair", viewing her like an "evil stepmother" in the overall storyline.

Lecturer Bronwen Calvert in 2017 wrote that the urinal scene functions not only as a Terminator reveal but also to emphasize Weaver as "a woman in a corporate environment, as someone who must assert herself continually." She also noted that different aspects of the character are established in the scene: "the killer cyborg, the corporate female, the 'bitch-boss'." Calvert observed that Weaver initially has no interest in mimicking human behavior, and wrote that her demeanor early in the season could be explained as her "adopting strategies suitable to women in power and connected with the stereotype of the 'bitch'", noting her "severely styled red hair and tailored, monochrome clothing." She concluded that Weaver "becomes less stony and one-dimensional" by the end of the series.

Lecturer Eve Bennett in 2019 wrote that Weaver "cannot be described as a thoroughly 'good' character because she ruthlessly massacres many humans in the course of achieving her aim", citing the warehouse sequence as an example. Nevertheless, she noted that Weaver's role – as a "powerful and soberly dressed" executive who turns out to be on the protagonists' side – "certainly contrasts with traditional representations of the female cyborg as a malevolent yet sexy 'tool'."
