= Mackenzie Smith =

American actress (born 2001)

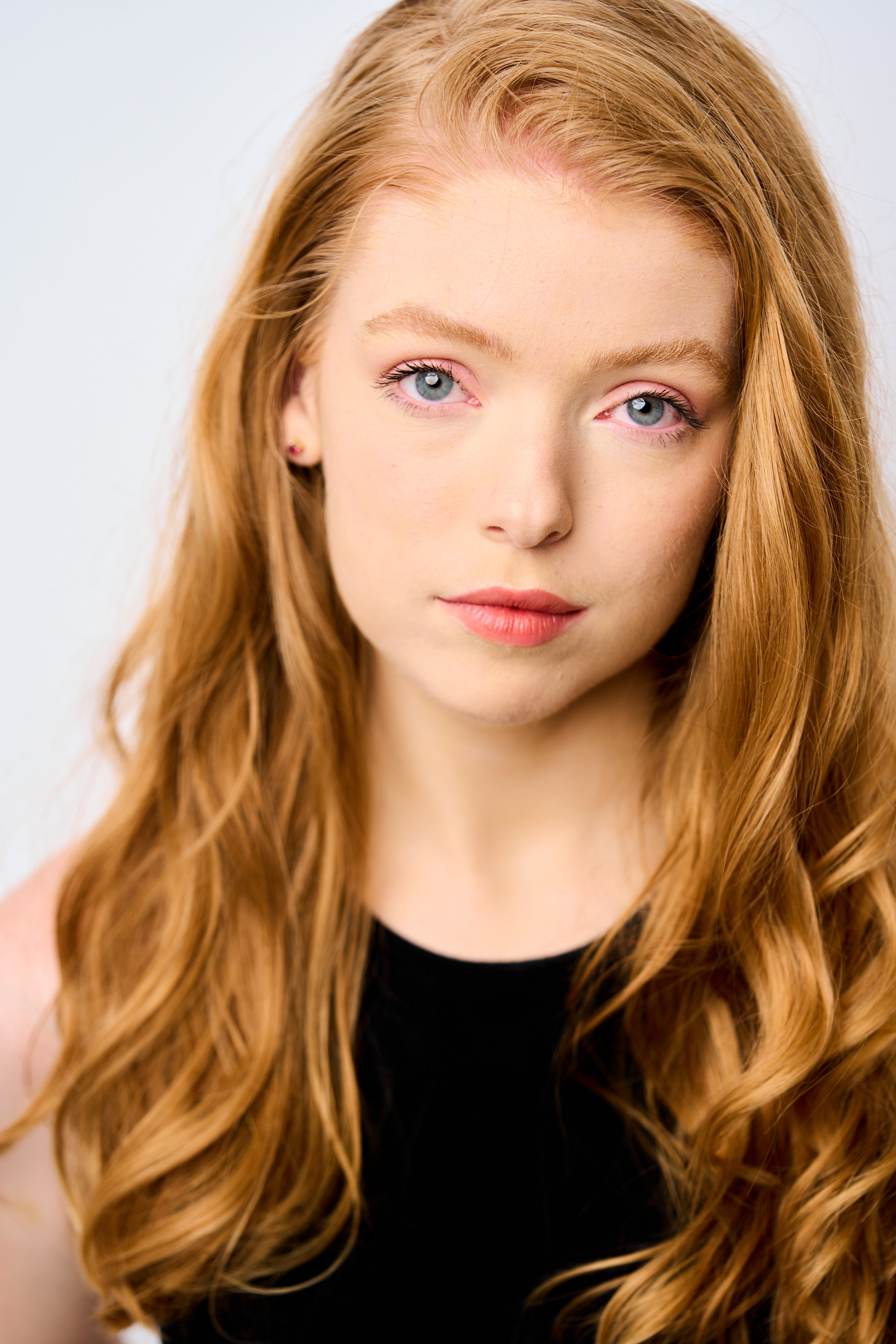
- Smith in 2022
- Born: Mackenzie Brooke Smith; February 6, 2001 (age 25); Florida, U.S.
- Occupation: Actress
- Years active: 2006–present

Mackenzie Brooke Smith (born February 6, 2001) is an American actress, most notable for her recurring role on Terminator: The Sarah Connor Chronicles as Savannah, the daughter of Catherine Weaver. She also appeared in the 2016 motion picture The Family Fang, alongside Nicole Kidman and Jason Bateman. Smith has also guest starred in such television series as Grey's Anatomy, 100 Things to Do Before High School, Desperate Housewives and The Middle.

== Career ==
Smith is best known for her recurring role in Terminator: The Sarah Connor Chronicles as Savannah Weaver, the daughter of Catherine Weaver and Lachlan Weaver. Early in her career, Smith appeared in The Passenger as Claire Currie. She had a small role in Road to the Altar as Brooke, a girl who plays with her sister in a hair and makeup shop. Smith also had a small part in Pushing Daisies as the younger Lily Charles in the episode "Kerplunk". In 2010, Smith appeared in two episodes of Desperate Housewives as Rachel Miller. She also appeared in The Middle as Megan, a young girl that goes to school with Brick Heck.

In recent years, Smith has appeared as supporting characters in films such as A Winter Rose, The Family Fang, which was directed by Jason Bateman, and the thriller anthology Phobias, where she acted alongside Lauren Miller Rogen. Her most notable work in television as a teenager and adult include the recurring role of Martha in 100 Things to Do Before High School, and guest starring as Ella Nelstadt in Grey's Anatomy.

== Filmography ==
=== Film ===
Year	Title	Role	Notes
2008	Pubert	Anna	Short
2009	The Passenger	Claire Currie	Short
2009	Turn Around	Gracie	Short
2009	Road to the Altar	Brooke	
2009	Dinner	Emily	Short
2010	Growth	Gwen Anderson	
2011	God Bless America	Ava	
2011	Shuffle	Pigtails	
2011	Finding Hope	Ella	Short
2012	Price Check		
2015	Theodora	Theodora	Short
2015	The Family Fang	Young Annie Fang	
2016	A Winter Rose	Young Winter Rose	
2021	Phobias	Blaire	

=== Television ===
Year	Title	Role	Notes
2008–09	Terminator: The Sarah Connor Chronicles	Kid in Future Underground Camp	1 episode (uncredited)
2008–09	Terminator: The Sarah Connor Chronicles	Savannah Weaver	6 episodes
2009	Pushing Daisies	Young Lily Charles	Episode: "Kerplunk"
2009–10, 2012	Desperate Housewives	Rachel Miller	Episodes: "Everybody Ought to Have a Maid", "How About a Friendly Shrink?"
2009–10, 2012	Desperate Housewives	Young Bree Van de Kamp	Episode: "Women and Death"
2010	100 Questions	Tasha	Episode: "Are You Romantic?"
2010	Criminal Minds	Kiara	Episode: "Reflection of Desire"
2010–12, 2016	The Middle	Megan	4 episodes
2011	Mad Love	Young Connie	Episode: "The Kate Gatsby"
2011	The Fresh Beat Band	Young Marina	Episodes: "Band in a Jam, Parts 1 & 2"
2012	Victorious	Rhoda Hellberg	Episode: "Robbie Sells Rex"
2013	Deadtime Stories	Anna	Episode: "Grave Secrets"
2015–16	100 Things to Do Before High School	Martha St. Reynolds	Recurring role
2016	Supergirl	Female Student #1	Episode: "Manhunter"
2019	Grey's Anatomy	Ella Nelstadt	Episode: "Blood and Water"

=== Music videos ===
Year	Title	Artist
2016	Kept	Stolen Jars

== Awards ==
Awards
Year	Result	Award	Category	Nominated Work
2009	Nominated	Young Artist Awards	Best Recurring Young Actress in a Television Series	Terminator: The Sarah Connor Chronicles
