= Born to Run (Terminator: The Sarah Connor Chronicles) =

- Terminator: The Sarah Connor Chronicles episode
- Cameron (Summer Glau)'s endoskeleton is exposed
- Episode no.: Season 2 Episode 22
- Directed by: Jeffrey Hunt
- Written by: Josh Friedman
- Cinematography by: Stephen Collins
- Production code: 3T7322
- Original air date: April 10, 2009

Guest appearances
- Joshua Malina; Jonathan Jackson; Carlos Sanz; Shane Edelman; Sabrina Perez; Jeffrey Pierce

Episode chronology
← Previous "Adam Raised a Cain"	Next → —

"Born to Run" is the twenty-second episode of the second season of the American television series Terminator: The Sarah Connor Chronicles, and the thirty-first episode of the series. It was written by executive producer Josh Friedman and directed by Jeffrey Hunt. The episode was first broadcast on April 10, 2009 on Fox in the United States. It is the last episode of the program's second season and also served as the series finale due to cancellation. "Born to Run", like the previous episode, "Adam Raised a Cain", is named after a Bruce Springsteen song.

The episode takes place shortly after events depicted in the preceding episode, "Adam Raised a Cain". In that episode, Sarah Connor (Lena Headey) has been captured by the FBI while returning Savannah Weaver to James Ellison (Richard T. Jones), Derek Reese (Brian Austin Green) has been killed during the termination attempt on Savannah, while John Connor (Thomas Dekker) and the Terminator Cameron (Summer Glau) are in hiding, and the liquid metal Terminator Catherine Weaver (Shirley Manson) reveals that her intentions are quite different from what anyone believes them to be. In "Born to Run", John and Sarah finally meet Weaver, and the ensuing events alter the course of the series dramatically.

== Plot ==
Sarah (Headey) is questioned by FBI Agent Auldridge (Joshua Malina), who lists the charges against her and asks where her son is. Sarah claims that John (Dekker) died in the bank vault explosion (from the first episode of the series), but Auldridge states that he doesn't believe her. James Ellison (Jones) visits her, telling a largely unconvinced Sarah that he had no part in her capture and encourages her to tell the FBI the truth about Skynet and the future. Sarah points out that the last time she did that, it landed her in a psychiatric ward. After learning that Savannah Weaver (Mackenzie Brooke Smith) has been returned to her mother, Sarah stresses that the child is not safe, an exclamation observed via CCTV by Agent Auldridge as well as by John Henry (Dillahunt) and Catherine Weaver (Manson). Later, Auldrige changes his interrogation tactics, telling Sarah that he believes her about the machines, but Sarah insists that John is dead. As he departs, Auldridge reveals that Danny Dyson, son of Miles Dyson, has been missing for the past three months. Sarah sends a message to John, ordering him not to attempt a rescue.

Meanwhile, John and Cameron (Glau) are in hiding; when John says that he needs to research whether or not his mother's cancer might be caused by being around Cameron's nuclear power cell, Cameron states that internal sensors would be able to detect any radiation leakage. Frustrated, he asks about them, but Cameron states that they cannot be seen. John points out that machines are not perfect and, underneath it all, Cameron's original programming is to kill him.

Weaver has Ellison arrange a meeting with John, and destroys a terminator (Jeffrey Pierce) as it attempts to break into ZeiraCorp. Its processor chip is recovered but found to be coated in a phosphorus solution, which destroys it when extracted. Weaver asks John Henry if he can recover data from the damaged chip to find out who sent it. Ellison delivers Weaver's message, and when John appears unconvinced, Ellison relays the additional message from Weaver to Cameron: "Will you join us?" An affected Cameron quickly claims not to understand and immediately asks Ellison to leave. John observes that Cameron appears upset, but is told that machines are not capable of emotional response. Cameron removes her shirt and bra, explaining that John needs to understand that while reprogrammed, terminators are created with only one function, and that can never be undone. Cameron then gives John intimate access to her mechanics, so that he can see for himself that the power source is not leaking. Afterwards, Father Bonilla is contacted to tell Sarah they are breaking her out anyway. Elsewhere, Weaver learns from Murch (Shane Edelman) that moving John Henry to a more secure location might not be possible, as any change to the hardware, even something as minor as replacing a damaged wire, alters who John Henry is.

Cameron affects Sarah's escape, avoiding using lethal force on jail personnel while a monitoring John Henry assists by unlocking all the facility's doors. Sarah decides to meet with Weaver immediately, and wants Cameron to destroy John Henry. John confesses his love to his mother amid his concerns about her health. At their meeting, Weaver begins to speak of their common enemy, Skynet, but is interrupted by a flying drone attack. Weaver expands her body to shield them from the resulting blast, revealing her nature to the Connors and a shocked Ellison. They afterwards quickly make their way to the basement, and Weaver claims that Sarah's son cannot save the world without "her son", John Henry.

They discover John Henry missing and an immobile Cameron sans processor. An apology to John flashes across the screen of a nearby monitor. Weaver reveals that John Henry was being built to fight Skynet and has departed into the future by activating a time displacement device. Weaver activates the device and takes herself and John forward in time, leaving Sarah and Ellison behind. Weaver and John (but not Cameron) arrive naked in the future. Hearing voices, Weaver vanishes as John dons a nearby coat to cover himself and is captured by a human patrol led by Derek Reese (Brian Austin Green). John is shocked to see him alive again, and more so to learn that not only does Derek not know him, but no one else has ever heard of him, either. John turns to see the man who will be his father, Kyle Reese (Jonathan Jackson), and Allison Young (Summer Glau). In the room in which John and Weaver had arrived, Sarah's disembodied voice echoes unheard amidst a crackle of time displacement energy that she loves John too.

== Production ==
Travis Fickett of IGN notes an earlier comment by Josh Friedman that there would be a moment between Cameron and John, and called it "the best pseudo-romantic, uncomfortably sexy robot foreplay/cutting-you-open-to-feel-your-nuclear-core sequence ever" and that the performances of Glau and Dekker were "terrific in this moment, working on multiple levels in a scene that is wrong on many levels...Dekker actually managed, using just his expression, the thought of 'is it wrong for me to bang a lethal robot?'" Carr also points out that this episode was the first time in the series that the main character, Sarah Connor, actually uses the word "terminator".

Doug Norrie of Cinema Blend points out that two different interpretations exist for the aforementioned scene between John and Cameron, the first being an obvious allusion to the two making love. It also "symbolizes the aloneness John feels in the world forcing him to connect with the only thing that makes sense to him...he and Cameron are connected for good or bad."

Brian Austin Green (who portrays Derek Reese in the series) says in an interview with Jami Philbrick of Comic Book Resources that he understands the confusion over the season closer. He describes Josh Friedman's writing style as "a storyteller and he tells in a very biblical form. He's very good at laying out a season and making the entire season the story, not just episode to episode. There was a lot of payoff but then again, for season three, a lot of now new unanswered questions."

== Reception ==
Much of the commentary regarding the last episode of the season was colored by the widespread rumors that the episode might also be the last episode of the series. This rumor was confirmed by Fox on May 18, 2009.

Travis Fickett of IGN states that the most "frustrating" aspect of the episode is the possible cancellation of the series. "Too much television watching in recent history has involved this kind of suspense. You get invested in a show, you enjoy the hell out of it - and then a season ends with a massive cliffhanger. But instead of the suspense of what happens next, you have the suspense of whether or not you'll ever get to find out what happens next." He calls it a "great finale" that combines many of the elements building over the course of the two seasons and deepens both the world and the characters within it, making it a complex and engaging human drama. TV Critic Alan Sepinwall agrees, calling it "creepy".

NJ TV Critic Alan Sepinwall notes wryly in his blog that Freidman's season finale (if not series finale) is "very well played". If the series continues into a third season, Sepinwall notes how the episode creates numerous opportunities for expansion; if this was indeed the finale, he muses, then Friedman "pulled out all the stops". Sepinwall points out the performance of Jeffrey Pierce as the T-888 in the last two episodes as "the best" of the villain Terminators. "His scene at the gun store, and his reaction to Manson's non-death, both felt very much in Arnold mold while also echoing Summer Glau's work in seeming something other than human".

Bureau42, in its review of the episode, notes that the low part of this episode is that if this is the series finale, it was not the best place to conclude, though they don't blame the series creators for that. Overall, it rates the episode 34 out of a possible score of 42.

Kevin Carr of Film School Rejects notes that the first part of the second season had "serious focus problems" and that while improvements had occurred, he felt it might be a case of "too much, too late." Carr further notes that the lead-in to a third season seems promising. He points out that the entire season's events might have been planned by Weaver: "She orchestrated the "hit" on her by letting a piece of herself fly the assault vehicle into her window office (and quite possibly orchestrated the kidnapping of her own child). I’m sure I’m not the only one thinking this was a grand plan to get herself in the future with John Connor...alone."

Beth Aileen Lameman of the Tribune observes that "deep down, Cameron has some remnants of who she was before, her human self, and that it leaks out of her from time to time." She points out that John "cares enough about her to leap in time after her (the true essence of her) when John Henry takes her chip - apparently at her own offering - and jumps." Lameman further notes that Sarah's staying behind is confusing, thinking that "Finally, something Sarah is afraid of", as well as wondering how season three would proceed as she is the eponymous character of the series after all.

K. Tempest Bradford found herself angry that the last four episodes of the series had the sort of plot advancement that the entire season could have benefited from. As it was, the episode left more "unanswered questions and trailing plotlines". She opines that a program cannot count on being renewed for another season: "As other shows proved long ago, you can construct a season with a definable, questions-fully-answered ending and still continue if you’re picked up once more."

TvHolic calls the episode a "freaking awesome finale." Expanding on this, the reviewer expresses that "what the writers tried to do here, is [to bring] us to the beginning of it all, if it ever began somewhere/some time", to the point where John becomes the leader of the Human Resistance of the future. The reviewer concludes that "even though it works as a series finale, I would love for it to come back next season and clear things up a little for us!"

Norrie also shares the belief that John's travelling to the future returns to the beginning of the franchise, signalling "John's role in the beginning of the resistance. Terminator 3 aside, we never knew how exactly John Connor came to lead the resistance". Norrie concludes that the development "aligns perfectly and makes sense in more ways than one."

Zack Handlen of The A.V. Club notes that the episode contains a lot of exposition, to cover the body of plot points expressed in the episode as well as a "lot of echoes from the first two Terminator movies." He notes that one of the flaws of "Born to Run" is that it "spends too much time getting accomplished things we know have to be accomplished, pushing all the surprises and weirdness to the very end [...] any complaints on why should be relegated to "Run"'s final ten minutes." He opines that Friedman's answer to the problems presented by the "mess" of the various plot threads and holes "is to just go batshit crazy".

== Cancellation ==
Michael Ausiello of Entertainment Weekly states on April 14, 2009 that the rumors strongly indicated that the series was being cancelled, and that Fox insiders had "known for weeks". While no official announcement of cancellation had been issued, Ausiello pointed to the upcoming May release of the Fox fall schedule and that a decision had not yet been reached regarding the program's status. This was taken by Ausiello to mean 'cancellation'.

Bradford states that she believes that the last episode of the season might be the last of the series, as well. Handlen also thinks that "any reasonable assessment would have to admit that the chance of this series getting renewed for a third season are regrettably slim". James A. Stewart, writing for TVverdict notes that whether the series will return for a third season might depend upon foreign sales, DVD take, "and how bad Fox's Friday prospects are otherwise".

This is specifically contradicted by series writer Ashley Edward Miller. In a blog statement via Twitter, Miller responds: "Time for Ausiello's semi-annual SCC termination report. False again. (Remember "sets were destroyed" report? Now you know context, people)", pointing to an earlier occurrence wherein Ausiello had incorrectly determined that sets were being struck in anticipation of the series cancellation after the first season had concluded. Josh Friedman also responded wryly to the prediction via Twitter, quipping that he was "Waiting for Michael Åusiello to tell me what I'm supposed to do now with my career."

The rumors that the season finale were also to serve as the series closer as well were also rejected by Brian Austin Green, who portrays Derek Reese in the series. In an interview with Jami Philbrick of Comic Book Resources, Green claims that "there were no intentions of this being a series finale. It was absolutely a season finale." Green concedes that, due to the "incredibly serialized and incredibly intelligent" nature of the series, it can be "almost impossible" for new viewers to tune in to watch the show and pick up the plot quickly. Green acknowledges that filming a pilot for another series after his character had been killed off would fuel rumors of his departure and the end of the series, but notes that this made his reappearance all the more dramatic. He also pointed out that the series pilot he filmed was in 'second position', a status wherein if SCC is renewed, the second series simply recasts his role.

On May 18, 2009, Fox officially announced that it would not renew the show for a third season.

Long after the cancellation of the show, Thomas Dekker, who portrays John Connor in the series says in an interview "I loved the way it ended. I think the only thing that’s frustrating about how it ends is that it ended, at all. I think it was an ingenious cliffhanger to come back with. It was just sad that we didn’t come back with more, but them’s the breaks."
