= Self Made Man (Terminator: The Sarah Connor Chronicles) =

- Terminator: The Sarah Connor Chronicles episode
- Episode no.: Season 2 Episode 11
- Directed by: Holly Dale
- Written by: Toni Graphia
- Cinematography by: Stephen Collins
- Original air date: December 1, 2008

Guest appearances
- Billy Lush as Eric; Oren Dayan as Mike Silver; Todd Stashwick as Myron Stark / T-888

Episode chronology
← Previous "Strange Things Happen at the One Two Point"	Next → "Alpine Fields"

"Self Made Man" is the 20th episode (11th of the second season) of the United States television series Terminator: The Sarah Connor Chronicles. The episode aired on Fox on December 1, 2008, "Self Made Man" explores Cameron's nighttime activities of enlisting help to research a Terminator's presence in the past, as well as John Connor's continuing relationship with Riley Dawson.

== Plot ==
The plot of "Self Made Man" consists of two separate storylines.

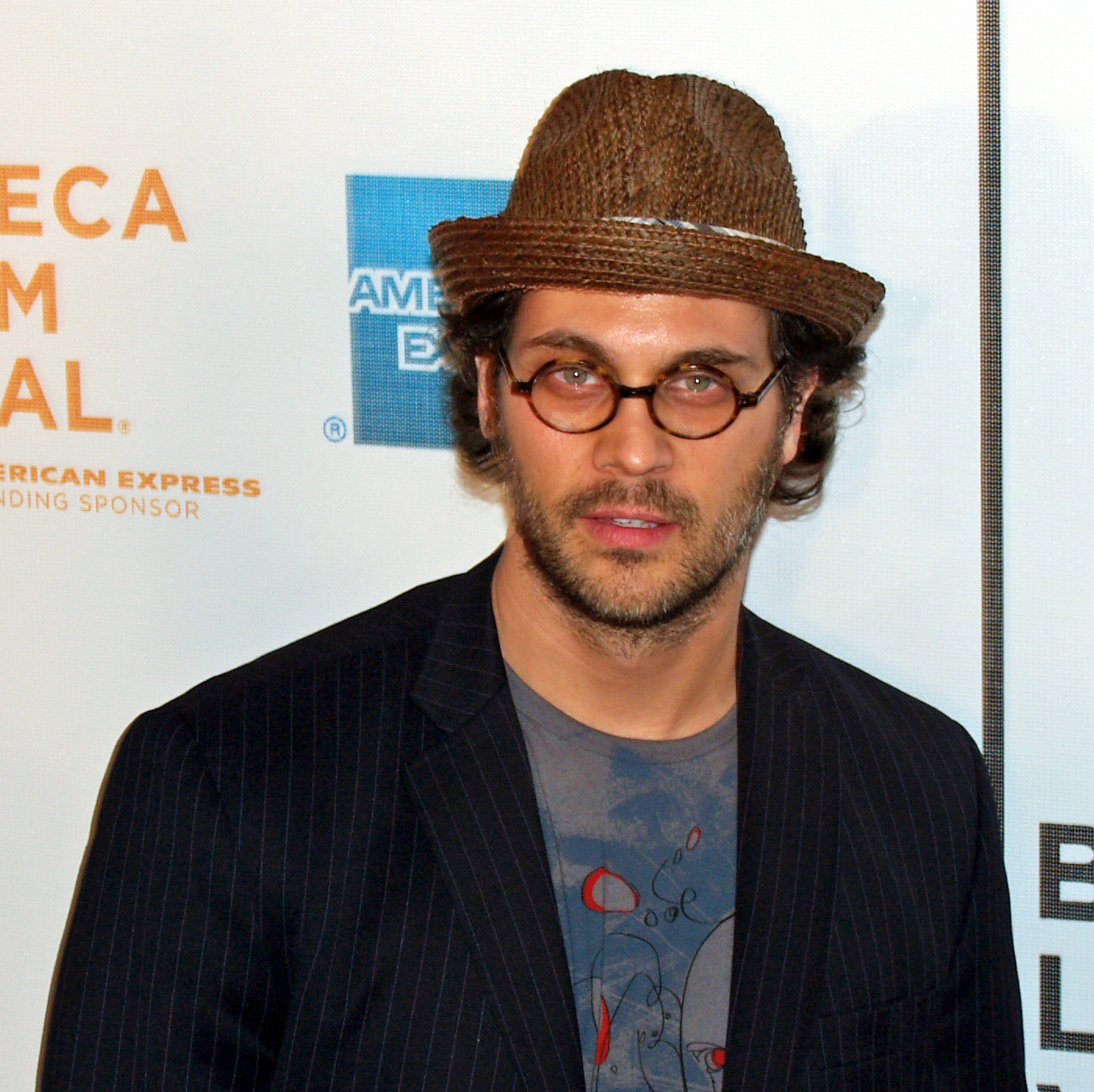
Todd Stashwick (2007) played the time-displaced Terminator.

While the Connors sleep, Cameron (Summer Glau) secretly visits the library and her friend, bone cancer survivor and nighttime library attendant, Eric (Billy Lush); it's revealed that Cameron has been doing this regularly to improve her human disguise and infiltration capabilities. After discovering the 1920 photograph of a T-888 model Terminator (Todd Stashwick), Cameron uses the library's resources to deduce that it time travelled to the wrong date. The T-888, having accidentally killed the architect of a downtown landmark (Pico Tower) crucial to its original mission of assassinating the governor of California in 2010, it invented a new identity: 1920s Los Angeles realty magnate, Myron Stark. As Stark, the T-888 funded and designed the building itself before ensconcing itself inside a wall to wait for New Year's Eve 2010. Returning to the library after finding and tending to Stark, Cameron damages her relationship with Eric by revealing to him that his cancer has returned; the following night however, Eric is missing, but Cameron is unconcerned and succeeds in wooing the new attendant with the doughnuts she had brought for Eric.

Simultaneously with Cameron's escapades, John (Thomas Dekker) also sneaks out of the house, responding to a phone call from Riley Dawson (Leven Rambin). Meeting her at a house party in Van Nuys, they leave after John beats up the host (Oren Dayan) for accosting Riley—who stole his lighter. Driving to a vista overlooking Los Angeles, John and Riley discuss their relationship and supposed foster family backgrounds. The show's official blog revealed that John Connor's fight was written knowing that he's still dealing with post-traumatic stress disorder and having killed Margos Sarkissian earlier in the season.

== Production ==
"Self Made Man" was written by Toni Graphia, and was director Holly Dale's first foray into the Terminator franchise. Ashley Edward Miller and Zack Stentz produced the episode, while the music was composed by Bear McCreary.

Graphia vetted the episode's historical information alongside the show's department heads, and History for Hire, a prop house specializing in period pieces. All of the 1920s scenes were shot on the Warner Bros. backlot, which itself was inaugurated during the same era. "Myron Stark's" meeting Rudolph Valentino (Branden R. Morgan) at the premiere of The Sheik is the first occasion of the series referencing a real-life person. The fictional Pico Tower was written at the intersection of Pico Boulevard and 3rd Street, despite the two roadways running parallel in real life. Costume designer Amanda Friedland created the flapper-themed wardrobe for "Self Made Man". Production wrapped on "Self Made Man" on October 15, 2008.

== Reception ==
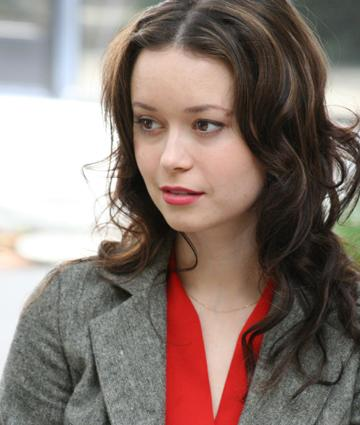
"The entire idea of Cameron would not work, conceptually, if [Summer Glau] were not able to pull it off as an actress. And she does, continually surprising with the nuances of her performance." —Travis Fickett (IGN)

Reviewing the episode for IGN, Travis Fickett extolled Summer Glau's performance, and held it up as an example of her acting ability keeping the whole series from failing. Fickett also explained that "Self Made Man" received better ratings than the preceding episodes of the series' second season. At the website Television Without Pity (TWoP), the staff review rated the episode a "C", and specifically took issue with the suspension of disbelief required for Cameron's ability to find anything and everything about the Myron Stark storyline in a closed public library; as of January 2010, 757 of their readers awarded it an average grade of "B+".

Though the series never specifically explains the three dots written on the Connors' basement wall in "Automatic for the People", reviewers (including IGN, TWoP, and Total Sci-Fi's Owen Van Spall) attributed them to this episode's revelation of the Terminators' temporal triangulation ability. Van Spall and TWoP also noted the plot point of the T-888's mission to kill the governor of California. Stark's assassination mission was to take place on New Year's Eve 2010, at which time Arnold Schwarzenegger would still be the Californian governor (leaving office in January 2011); Schwarzenegger is the star of the first three Terminator films in the franchise, having premiered the role in 1984.
