= Born to Run (disambiguation) =

Born to Run is an album by Bruce Springsteen.

Born to Run may also refer to:

== Literature ==
- Born to Run (McDougall book), a 2009 book by Christopher McDougall
- Born to Run (autobiography), a 2016 book by Bruce Springsteen
- Born to Run, a 2007 novel by Michael Morpurgo
- Born to Run, a 2008 novel by James Grippando

== Music ==
- "Born to Run" (song) (1975), song by Bruce Springsteen
- "Born to Run" (Emmylou Harris song) (1982)
- "Born to Run", a song by Lynyrd Skynyrd from The Last Rebel (1993)
- "Born to Run", a song by k-os from Atlantis: Hymns for Disco (2006)

== Television and film ==
- Born to Run (TV series), a 1997 television marathon drama series
- "Born to Run" (Lost), a 2005 episode of Lost
- "Born to Run" (Terminator: The Sarah Connor Chronicles), a 2009 episode of Terminator: The Sarah Connor Chronicles
- Born to Run (1977 film), a Disney film
- Budhia Singh – Born to Run, a 2016 Indian Hindi-language biographical film about child athlete Budhia Singh
