= Mechanical Turk (disambiguation) =

The Mechanical Turk is an 18th-century fake chess-playing machine.

Mechanical Turk may also refer to:

- Amazon Mechanical Turk, an online crowdsourcing marketplace platform
- The Turk, a fictional chess computer that became John Henry in Terminator: The Sarah Connor Chronicles
