= Pilot (Terminator: The Sarah Connor Chronicles) =

- Terminator: The Sarah Connor Chronicles episode
- Episode no.: Season 1 Episode 1
- Directed by: David Nutter
- Written by: Josh Friedman
- Cinematography by: Bill Roe
- Production code: 276022
- Original air date: January 13, 2008

Guest appearance
- Owain Yeoman as Cromartie (T-888)

Episode chronology
← Previous —	Next → "Gnothi Seauton"

"Pilot" is the pilot episode of the American science fiction television series Terminator: The Sarah Connor Chronicles. It is also the series premiere episode. It first aired on January 13, 2008, on Fox in the United States.

== Plot ==
The episode starts with Sarah Connor and her son John getting arrested. A Terminator suddenly appears and guns down all of the cops; John flees but is shot dead by the machine. A horrified Sarah screams at the Terminator to kill her, because nothing matters anymore. The Terminator replies that she is right; the world belongs to them, starting now. He proceeds to strangle Sarah as a nuclear explosion is seen in the background, completely destroying the surrounding area and reducing the Terminator down to its endoskeleton as Sarah dies clutching her son's corpse.

Sarah wakes up in bed with her fiancé, Charley Dixon. The date is August 24, 1999, and Sarah and John are living with Charley in West Fork, Nebraska. Sarah wakes her son up and tells him that they are leaving now. Charley wakes up to find his family missing and reports this to the police. FBI agent James Ellison contacts Charley and informs him that Sarah is an escaped mental patient wanted for terrorism: she blew up Cyberdyne Systems and murdered Miles Dyson after previously stating to the authorities her belief that Tyson would create a superintelligence destined to destroy humanity with nuclear weapons. Charley gives him Sarah's new alias, Sarah Reese, which is entered into her database file. Unbeknownst to Ellison, a Terminator hacks into the database and tracks Sarah and John to Red Valley, New Mexico.

At the local high school, John meets his attractive classmate Cameron Phillips. The Terminator enters the school by posing as their substitute teacher, using the name Cromartie. When John gives his name during attendance, Cromartie extracts a gun implanted in his leg and opens fire; Cameron is seemingly killed when she shields John with her body. Cromartie chases John into the parking lot and is about to shoot him when he gets run over by a truck. The driver turns out to be Cameron, who explains to John that she is also a Terminator, reprogrammed by his future allies to protect him. John learns that Skynet was ultimately completed and activated on April 19, 2011. Realizing that the war between humans and machines has not been averted, John convinces his mother that they need to prevent Skynet's completion.

John, Sarah, and Cameron go to the Dyson household in Los Angeles, asking his widow Terissa for the names of anyone with the ability to finish her husband's work. Cromartie finds them, so Cameron takes the Connors to a bank and forces an employee at gunpoint to seal them inside the main vault. Inside, she uncovers a time displacement transporter secretly installed by a time traveler decades earlier. Sarah uses an experimental isotope weapon also left by the traveler to destroy Cromartie as he tries to break into the vault while Cameron programs the transporter to send them from September 1999 to September 2007. The resulting explosion destroys the bank and erases all traces of the transporter. Arriving, they find themselves naked due to time travel destroying all non-living material. Cameron mugs three drunk men, stealing their clothes and car. The incident gets reported on TV as a college prank, but an older Charley sees the report and immediately recognizes Sarah.

== Reception ==
Ginia Bellafante of New York Times said "One of the more humanizing adventures in science fiction to arrive in quite a while, the series is taut, haunting, relevant and an exploration of adolescent exceptionalism rendered without the cheerleading uniforms and parody of Heroes." Bellafante described Lena Headey as "all anxious muscle" and wrote "John, played by Thomas Dekker, complements Sarah's intensity with a quiet anguish." Bellafante described the episode as "a fantasy of technophobic paranoia, but it is also a metaphor for mad, crazy blood love, for motherhood not merely as an honorable career but also as salvation. Keeping John safe has required Sarah to learn four languages, work at 23 jobs, assume nine aliases and submit to years in a mental hospital."

Mark A. Perigard of the Boston Herald wrote "In the dregs of the writers strike, with most dramas sputtering, the new Fox series (debuting tonight...) is a megawatt jolt to the heart, crackling with exhilarating stunts, plot swerves and, most unexpectedly, a touch of humanity. It's everything Bionic Woman should have been." Perigard wrote, "The first two episodes continuing the big-budget Terminator blockbusters present a richly reimagined life for Sarah Connor and her teenaged son John, destined one day to lead humanity's resistance fighters against relentless cybernetic enemies." Perigard said, "Fortunately for John, his future self sent back another cybernetic protector in the form of a beautiful teenager named Cameron (Summer Glau, Firefly)." Perigard said, "Director David Nutter has a firm grasp on the electrifying action sequences but displays a deft touch in the smaller moments", said "[John's] longing for a father figure is palpable...", and said "Headey won't make anyone forget Linda Hamilton's memorable turn in the second film and her voice-overs are unconvincing. Give her time to grow into the role."

Daniel Fienberg of Zap2it.com wrote that even without the writer's strike there was going to be a lot of pressure on the show and said "it was still going to be a costly, high-risk, big-name gambit." Fienberg wrote "My immediate reaction, after watching the first two episodes of Sarah Connor, is that the series is by no means a disaster." Fienberg said "the transition to the small screen has been as smooth as one could hope, particularly in terms of the inevitably diminished production values." Fienberg said the first two episodes lacked "the sort of single-minded purpose that defined the two James Cameron films" but said they were "neither fish nor fowl." Fienberg said the end of the pilot took "slightly ludicrous steps...to erase nearly all of the possibilities of the third movie." Fienberg said, "Ideally, the show becomes less a series of weekly chases and escapes from brutal robot slaughter and more a chronicle of how a single mother and her son attempt to live their lives when imminent death is like another member of the family." Fienberg said the show "isn't really of blockbuster scope" and "no more ambitious than, say, last spring's prematurely cancelled Drive." Fienberg said "Headey's in a tough place" due to Linda Hamilton's performance as Sarah Connor, but said "The stand-out in early episodes is Glau, showcasing the same sort of deceptively passive deadpan mixed with physical grace that fans of Firefly came to love."
