= Cameron (Terminator) =

Fictional character in the Terminator franchise

- Terminator: The Sarah Connor Chronicles character
- Summer Glau as Cameron
- First appearance: "Pilot" (2008)
- Last appearance: "Born to Run" (2009)
- Created by: Josh Friedman
- Portrayed by: Summer Glau

In-universe information
- Aliases: Cameron Baum; Cameron Phillips; Allison Young; Emily Gage
- Species: Cyborg
- Manufacturer: Skynet

Cameron is a fictional character on the Fox television series Terminator: The Sarah Connor Chronicles, which is a spin-off of the Terminator film franchise. Cameron is an unknown model of Terminator—a fictional type of android envisioned as a soldier and assassin, with living tissue over a metal endoskeleton. Cameron first appeared in the series' pilot episode. She is portrayed by actress Summer Glau who, in 2008, won a Saturn Award for Best Supporting Actress on Television for her performance.

Cameron is from the apocalyptic future described throughout the Terminator franchise, in which a self-aware computer program, Skynet, launches a nuclear destruction and wages war against a rebellion led by John Connor. Cameron's exterior appearance is based on Allison Young, a human Resistance fighter close to John, allowing her to replace Allison in an attempt to infiltrate John's camp. Cameron is the most realistic cyborg yet encountered, with detailed programming of social behavior.

In the pilot, Cameron is sent back in time to 1999 by John to protect his younger self and his mother Sarah, and if possible to prevent the creation of Skynet. Cameron's role as John's guardian mimics that of Arnold Schwarzenegger's character in the second and third films.

Although initially referred to as Cameron Phillips, that surname was used only in the pilot episode. Since then, she generally poses as John's sister and, accordingly, uses whatever surname is being used by the Connors at the time. For much of the series, that name is Baum, an homage to author L. Frank Baum; Sarah used to read Baum's novel The Wonderful Wizard of Oz to John when he was a young boy. In the series finale, Cameron is given the new alias Emily Gage.

== Character concept ==
Cameron was named in homage to Terminator film franchise creator James Cameron, whose original Terminator character concept was referenced by series creator Josh Friedman as he created the character. James Cameron envisioned Terminators as robotic, humanoid infiltration units "that could blend in with humanity". In keeping with this idea, Friedman introduced his character as the most advanced model of Terminator, whose ascendancy over other models was defined by its ability to mimic human behavior. The decision to make the character appear to be a teenaged female with a small physical stature was also influenced by James Cameron's infiltrator idea. According to consulting producer James Middleton, "Terminators—and this is from [James] Cameron's vision of the mythology—are actually infiltrators. If that is the case, then what better infiltrator than a beautiful, petite teenage girl?"

Cameron's background story was introduced in the season two episode "Allison from Palmdale", which was written by co-executive producer Toni Graphia. Graphia's conception of Cameron's past was heavily influenced by a scene Friedman originally wrote only for the actresses auditioning for the role of Cameron. The scene detailed Cameron revealing to John how, in the future, she came to find and attempt to kill him after torturing a resistance fighter for information on his location. Finding that the story within the scene aligned with the show's mythology and also answered fan questions about Cameron's origins, Graphia fitted the scene's content into "Allison from Palmdale", giving the resistance fighter from Friedman's scene a name (Allison Young) and adding the plot detail concerning Cameron's external appearance being based upon that of the resistance fighter.

When Cameron first appeared in the pilot episode, she behaved with more human mannerisms, but these faded in subsequent episodes. It has been confirmed by Friedman that this behavioral change was the result of a conscious decision. However, the explanations he has given of the logistics behind this decision have varied. At the Television Critics Association press tour, he stated that within the story, Cameron had been prepared for the events of the pilot. Once the characters "jumped forward in time though, she was as adrift as everyone else". In an interview with IGN, Friedman stated that as he wrote the second episode, he became interested in exploring the "calmer, odder part of" Cameron, reflected in a scene in the pilot in which Cameron asks questions of John "in a very programmed way". He continued to say that Cameron's behavior may appear inconsistent to a viewer, but that this inconsistency may be operative in the completion of her tasks. In any case, the character's robotic interactions with humans were manipulated for humor, but Friedman did express a wish to avoid "cheap jokes" in favor of more seriously exploring Cameron's existence as a cyborg. Summer Glau in an interview said about Cameron's changing behavior: "We were experimenting with Cameron quite a bit, and we wanted her to be able to seem human. We wanted especially John to be fooled by her, so that he would let her into his life. And so in the pilot, I do act very human. And then as I go through the series, it appears that I've taken steps back and that I am acting more like a Terminator would. We did that for several different reasons, but I know for me it's fun because I get to take more time for her development, her human development. I think that it also is funny and I think once her cover was blown with the Connors, she kind of was able to drop that persona and become who she really is around them, if that answers the question."

Friedman also hoped to use Cameron as a device to advance the "coming-of-age" theme, of John Connor's maturation from an adolescent into a man that he intended to incorporate into the narrative. To do this, Friedman planned on portraying Cameron as a second significant female presence in John's life, after his mother, Sarah. He believed Cameron would be instrumental in lessening John's dependence on Sarah, and thereby encouraging John's growth into adulthood. In season two, this idea was expanded to include yet another female presence in John's life: the teenaged human Riley. According to Summer Glau, Riley's introduction allowed her to explore the possibility that a robot could feel jealousy—an idea that, along with a subplot about a functional glitch in Cameron, played heavily into one of the season's main storylines regarding the efforts of a character named Jesse Flores to reduce Cameron's influence over John.

== Summer Glau ==
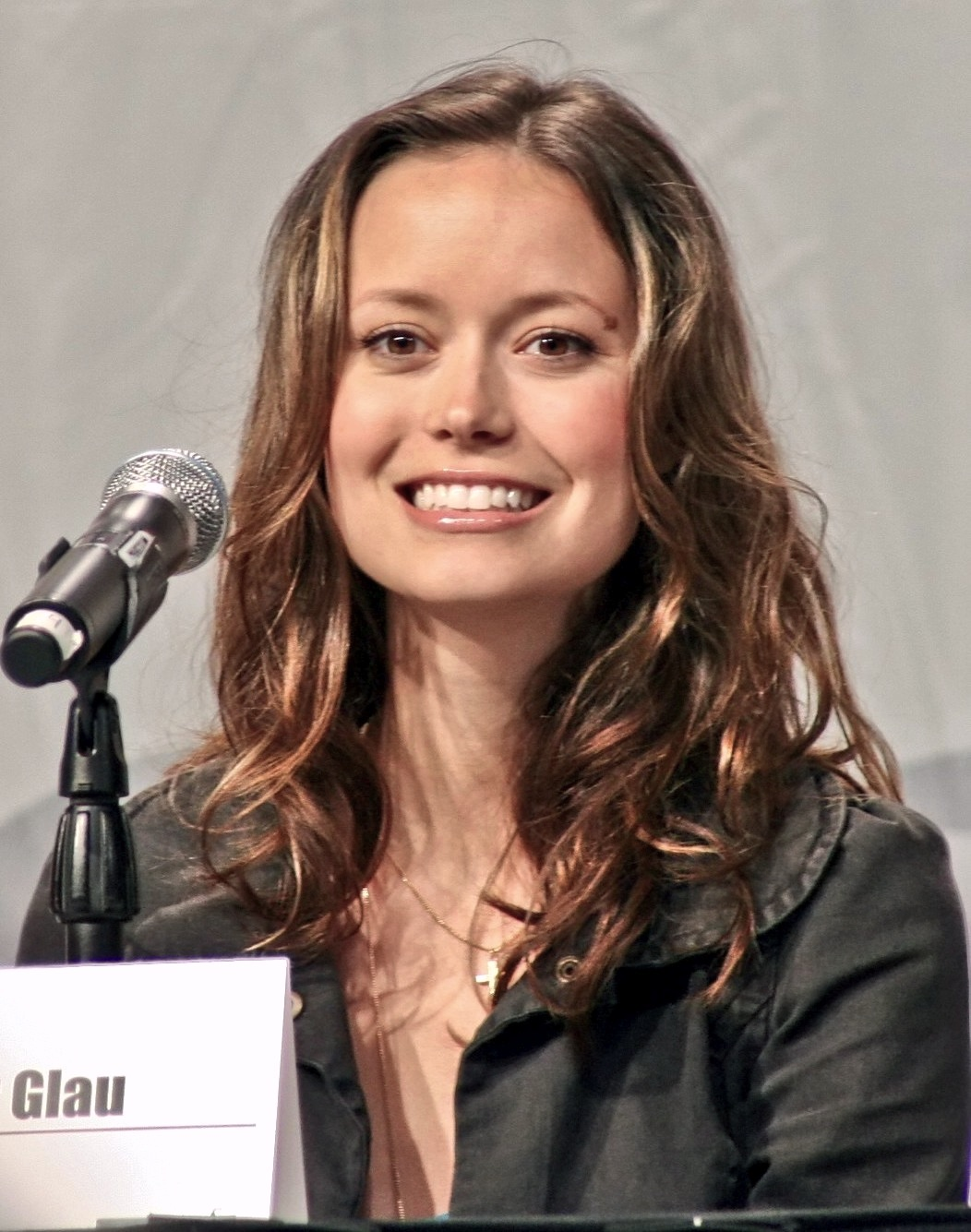
Summer Glau at WonderCon 2008

Four years prior to The Sarah Connor Chronicles, Friedman developed another pilot in which he wanted to cast Summer Glau. However, she was already committed to Serenity, a spin-off film of the television series Firefly, on which Glau was a regular. Despite this, Friedman "always kept her in mind" and, as the pilot for The Sarah Connor Chronicles was being cast, she was called in to audition. Glau did not plan on auditioning, however, because she had a preconceived idea that the producers wanted "statuesque, icy blondes" for the role, and felt that she did not suit such an image. She agreed to audition after being encouraged by her mother to do so and became comfortable with the idea of performing upon the realization that Friedman had a different idea for how Terminators would be portrayed on the show.

Friedman wrote the scene used for the audition. It involved Cameron discussing with John the future in which she meets him, how he saves her life and how she feels about him, even though as a robot she is technically incapable of any feeling at all. The audition continued with Friedman and the other producers watching Glau's fight scenes from her previous work on Firefly and Serenity. Glau was cast in February 2007 with Friedman feeling that "there was really no second choice [and that Cameron was] basically written for her." Lena Headey, who portrays Sarah Connor, revealed Glau's role to the public a month later.

Glau trained with stunt coordinator Joel Kramer to prepare for the physical demands of her role. In learning martial arts for Serenity, Glau used her training in ballet to learn fight scenes by counts, as if they were choreographies. About bringing the practice to Terminator, Glau said, "When you're working with a stunt guy ... and you need to anticipate every swing he's going to take at you ... it's important that you know exactly the timing that it's all going to play out." Training focused heavily on the destruction of breakable set pieces, safety in hand-to-hand fights and the use of a variety of firearms. Glau was challenged during fight scenes by not being able to move or act humanly by things such as pushing her hair out of her face. Glau modeled Cameron's walk after that of a dressage horse for its precision.

== Characteristics ==
The factory in which Cameron is built is shown in "Heavy Metal" when the cyborg and the Connors track a shipment there of coltan—the metal from which Terminator endoskeletons are constructed.

The appearance of Cameron's outer organic covering is modeled after a captured human resistance fighter, Allison Young. The episode "Allison from Palmdale" shows the cyborg interrogating Allison in a future Skynet prison about the details of her life, the location of John Connor, and the nature of Allison's superficially innocuous bracelet pass. Once the interrogation is complete, the Terminator kills Allison and sets out to infiltrate the resistance in Allison's place to terminate John and "place his head upon a pike for all to see".

At some point, the cyborg is captured and reprogrammed by John to serve as their ally, as were the T-800 and T-850 in the second and third films, and another Terminator in The Sarah Connor Chronicles episode "Dungeons & Dragons". Flashbacks detailing Cameron's time in that episode exhibit John's uncle, resistance fighter Derek Reese (Brian Austin Green), acting with suspicion towards Cameron. When a reprogrammed Terminator suddenly goes on a rampage before Cameron destroys it, Cameron explains to Derek that "Sometimes they go bad. No one knows why." In the episode "Mr. Ferguson Is Ill Today", Cameron claims to be the confidant of a lonely John Connor in the future (as Allison was prior her death). Jesse (Stephanie Jacobsen), a rogue time-traveling resistance fighter, confirms the pair's close relationship in "Strange Things Happen at the One Two Point" and suggests that the present-day Cameron may still be John's confidant twenty years in the future.

In the pilot episode, Cameron states she was sent to 1999 from the year 2027 by the future incarnation of John Connor to protect himself. This departure from 2027 follows those of each of the Reese brothers on similar missions, as evidenced by the cyborg's presence in his headquarters in "Dungeons & Dragons" when the Reeses both leave. A temporal engineer is sent back in time to 1963 to build and hide a time machine in a bank vault. Either departing prior to Cameron, or contacting Cameron after her arrival in the past and informing her of its location, operation and date of installation. In the timeline from which Cameron came back from the future, John had been an orphan since 2005 when Sarah died of cancer.

Cameron arrives in the town of Red Valley, New Mexico, and enrolls as a high school student under the name "Cameron Phillips", sometime prior to the Connors' relocation to the town. In the fall semester, sometime after the Connors leave Nebraska on August 24, 1999, John enrolls in the high school and is immediately greeted by his classmate, Cameron, fully aware of his identity. Cameron saves his life from substitute teacher Mr. Cromartie (Owain Yeoman), a T-888 Terminator, using the phrase "Come with me if you want to live," the same words said both to Sarah by Kyle Reese in the first film and by the T-800 to both Connors in the second film. Chased by Cromartie, Cameron takes the Connors to a bank branch, sealing themselves in the vault, where she assembles and activates a time displacement device with their assistance, sending them forward to 2007 with the intention of preventing the creation of Skynet, thereby eliminating the threat it would later pose. Several plot lines that spanned the rest of the season were introduced in the three episodes immediately following the pilot. However, the season was cut short because of the 2007–2008 Writers Guild of America strike.

The first season's main story arc concerned the efforts of Cameron and the Connors to locate and retrieve a chess-playing computer called The Turk, which was destined to evolve into Skynet. In the second episode, "Gnothi Seauton", Cameron and Sarah obtained weapons, money and information on Skynet's creation from resistance fighters, including Derek, sent to 2007 from Cameron's time. This information led Sarah to the man responsible for the computer's creation, Andy Goode (Brendan Hines), in the following episode. Two episodes later, Andy was killed, The Turk was stolen and, in a story arc that encompassed the second half of the season, Cameron worked with Sarah, John and Derek to acquire it from a man named Margos Sarkissian (James Urbaniak). However, Sarkissian managed to catch Cameron in a car bomb, as part of the season finale's cliffhanger.

Two additional plot lines are also developed over the course of the season. In the fourth episode, "Heavy Metal", Cameron discovered that Cromartie (now portrayed by Garret Dillahunt) continued to pursue John after the events of the pilot. Several episodes later, Cameron identified Cromartie posing as an FBI agent, unsuccessfully looking for John. The episode "Heavy Metal" also introduced a storyline concerning Cameron assembling materials involved in the construction of a Terminator. The cyborg has collected a bar of coltan—a metal used in Terminators' endoskeletons—and a computer chip from a Terminator destroyed in the episode "Queen's Gambit". It is suggested in subsequent episodes that these pieces were retained to effect necessary repairs.

In the second season finale, Cameron denies that exposure to Terminators and their shielded nuclear power cells cause cancer in humans, as John believes that if his mother is sick it could be from living with her for so long. Cameron states that she has internal sensors to detect radiation leakage. While rescuing Sarah from the Los Angeles County lockup, Cameron sustains heavy damage, including the loss of her left eye covering. Cameron then enters the basement of ZeiraCorp to find John Henry. The cyborg's body is subsequently found inside the room where John Henry was kept, but missing its chip as the original chip (from Cromartie) was destroyed by Sarah Connor. When John and the T-1001 give chase into the future, a character portrayed by Glau is present, but it is Allison Young and not Cameron, as Friedman stated in the episode's audio commentary.

== Reception ==
In 2008, Glau won the Saturn Award for Best Supporting Actress on Television for her portrayal of Cameron. In the same year, she was also nominated for two Teen Choice Awards for her work on Terminator, in the categories of favorite action adventure television actress and favorite female breakout television star. Glau was also a nominee for the Saturn Award for Best Supporting Actress on Television in 2009.

In a poll held by E! Online columnist Kristin Dos Santos after the series premiere, 60% of participants voted Glau their favorite series regular. Her performance has been praised as one of the show's best elements, with The Star-Ledger commenting, "if there's a reason to stick with 'Sarah Connor,' it's Glau," and Zap2it.com exclaiming that Glau was "the stand-out in early episodes". IGN also praised Glau's performance of the human character Allison Young in season two, writing, "This episode would never have worked if Summer Glau was not as good as she is ... Glau [is] terrific as the flesh and blood Allison, and it's wonderful to see her display unbridled emotion..." However, Mark Wilson of About.com called Glau "infinitely [flat]" and wrote, "I know robots are supposed to be emotionally muted, but Glau's character comes across as lobotomized." In another negative review, Tim Goodman of the San Francisco Chronicle wrote that Glau "looks like a teenage Ally McBeal" who might "get her teeth punched in by wispy Willow from Buffy the Vampire Slayer".

The actual character, Cameron, has also received a mixed response. A reviewer for the Los Angeles Times said that Cameron "conveys an intriguing, if limited, humanity that, one hopes, will enrich future story lines". In another E! Online poll, the character was voted the favorite model of Terminator, accumulating 53% of the vote. Criticisms have focused on the character's seemingly uneven ability to behave humanly. In a review of the episode "The Turk", Marc Bernardin of Entertainment Weekly called Cameron an "inconsistent machine", saying that in the first episode she could "navigate high school like a pro", but that after, she "displayed an alarming lack of savvy when dealing with members of the human race". Travis Fickett of IGN also noted the change in the character's writing, calling it "an unintended continuity problem", and describing the response as "a point of contention with fans".

== See also ==
- Terminator (character concept)
- Woman warrior
- List of women warriors in folklore
