= Entity FX =

- Founded: 2006
- Headquarters: Santa Monica, California, United States

Entity FX is a visual effects company. The company was founded in Santa Monica, California, and branched out to Vancouver, British Columbia, Canada in December 2006.

It did all of the visual effects for the TV show Smallville from its second season onward.

In 2004, the company won a VES Award for the effects it created for a frozen rain sequence in one of Smallville's episodes. Other projects that Entity FX did visual effects for include Spider-Man 2, The Aviator, The Nutty Professor, and Galaxy Quest.

Entity FX did the visual effects for the television series Harper's Island.
