= List of Terminator: The Sarah Connor Chronicles characters =

The following is a list of characters in the FOX science fiction television series Terminator: The Sarah Connor Chronicles, a sequel to the Terminator films The Terminator (1984) and Terminator 2: Judgment Day (1991), ignoring the events of Terminator 3: Rise of the Machines (2003); including protagonists, supporting characters, and important villains.

== Overview ==
List indicators
- A dark gray cell indicates that the character was not present.
- A ^{C} indicates a cameo role.
- A ^{G} indicates a guest appearance.
- An ^{M} indicates the actor was part of the main cast.
- An ^{R} indicates a recurring role.
- A ^{Y} indicates a younger version of the character.

| Character | Films | | Seasons | |
| Character | The Terminator | Terminator 2: Judgment Day | Season 1 | Season 2 |
Main characters
| Sarah Connor | Linda Hamilton^{M} | Linda Hamilton^{M} | Lena Headey^{M} | Lena Headey^{M} |
| John Connor | | Edward Furlong^{M} | Thomas Dekker^{M} | Thomas Dekker^{M} |
| Cameron | | | Summer Glau^{M} | Summer Glau^{M} |
| Allison Young | | | Summer Glau^{M} | Summer Glau^{M} |
| James Ellison | | | Richard T. Jones^{M} | Richard T. Jones^{M} |
| Derek Reese | | | Brian Austin Green^{R} | Brian Austin Green^{M} |
| George Laszlo / Cromartie | | | Garret Dillahunt^{R} (Note: Portrayed in the pilot by Owain Yeoman.) | Garret Dillahunt^{M} |
| John Henry | | | | Garret Dillahunt^{M} |
| Riley Dawson | | | | Leven Rambin^{M} |
| Catherine Weaver / T-1001 | | | | Shirley Manson^{M} |
| Kyle Reese | Michael Biehn^{M} | Michael Biehn^{C} | Jonathan Jackson^{G} Skyler Gisondo^{Y} | Jonathan Jackson^{G} |

== A ==
=== Auldridge ===
Auldridge (introduced in "Born to Run"), portrayed by Joshua Malina, is an FBI Agent who handles difficult unsolved cases involving unusual evidence or facts. He meets with the captured Sarah Connor twice while in prison. On both occasions, he tries to get Sarah to tell him the whereabouts of her son, John Connor, but Sarah refuses to talk. He is visited by (and knows) former FBI Agent James Ellison to discuss Ellison's former case.

== B ==
=== Martin Bedell ===
Martin Bedell (introduced in "Goodbye to All That"), portrayed by Will Rothhaar, plays a role in forming the core of Tech-Com using his military training and experience. In the present, Derek Reese and John Connor save him from a T-888 while he is a Cadet Captain at a military academy. In Derek's future, he participates in a mission with John of freeing Skynet's prisoners from one of its concentration camps, Century, including Kyle Reese. Years after the event on the Century workcamp, he sacrifices himself to save Kyle, John, and 39 prisoners from Skynet forces.

=== Marty Bedell ===
Marty Bedell (introduced in "Goodbye to All That"), portrayed by Billy Unger, is a child targeted by a T-888 because he shares the same name as a future hero of the Human Resistance. Remembering that two other Sarah Connors were killed in 1984 by the T-800 hunting for her, Sarah shelters and protects the boy with the guardian terminator Cameron, while John Connor and his uncle Derek Reese hunt the T-888. In the Connor home, Marty prepares a book report on L. Frank Baum's The Wonderful Wizard of Oz for school. Cameron suggests the novel after finding it on a shelf in their home and reminding Sarah that it was John's favorite book as a child.

=== Father Armando Bonilla ===
Father Armando Bonilla (introduced in "Samson and Delilah"), portrayed by Carlos Sanz, is a priest to whose church Sarah and John Connor flee when escaping from a malfunctioning Cameron. He provides sanctuary to the Connors while they prepare a booby trap for Cameron, anticipating that she will be able track them down. Father Bonilla is shocked when John tries to cut into Cameron's skull to remove her chip but is quickly chased away by Sarah. Bonilla appears again in the season finale, conducting a confession to who turns out to be Chola, the lookout in Carlos' gang in the first season. They seem to have some distant family relations. Bonilla is also asked for by Sarah when she is incarcerated in LA County Lockup and gets trapped in Sarah's chamber when Cameron assaults the security to break her out.

=== Felicia Burnett, MD ===
Dr. Felicia Burnett (introduced in "The Good Wound"), portrayed by Laura Regan, treats Sarah Connor's gun wound. She is revealed to have a past with the sheriff who is investigating Sarah's shoot-out in the Kaliba warehouse. Felicia assumes that Sarah is being abused and shot by her boyfriend/husband and relates with her. Due to this empathy, Sarah confides her family secrets such as John and Kyle Reese's relations. After a failed attempt to remove the bullet from Sarah's thigh, they sneak into a hospital morgue where Felicia successfully removes it. After the operation, Derek Reese enters the room, and thinking him to be Sarah's abusive boyfriend, Felicia pulls a gun on Derek. During the stand-off, Felicia's own abusive husband steps in and coarsely orders Felicia to stand down. Overwhelmed, Felicia shoots and kills him and watches as Sarah and Derek leave.

== C ==
=== Carlos ===
Carlos is portrayed by Jesse Garcia (introduced in "Gnothi Seauton"). He is Enrique's nephew, and purveyor of forged documents. He calls his uncle a stool pigeon. Among those who sought his service were Sarah and John Connor, and Cameron. During a meeting with FBI Special Agent James Ellison in a deleted scene of the episode "The Turk", it is implied that Carlos also forged identification and allied documents for Derek Reese and his unit at some point after their arrival from 2027. Carlos' gang are brutally slaughtered by Margos Sarkissian's men.

=== Carter ===
Carter, portrayed by Brian Bloom, is a Terminator, whose model type is unknown. He was sent back in time to 2007 by Skynet to acquire and store a large amount of Coltan, the metal used to construct Terminators, in the episode "Heavy Metal". Carter hires various human military personnel, who are unaware of what he truly is, to assist him in his assignment. Once his mission is completed, Carter kills his humans, secures the storage area, and shuts himself down to await further orders. Cameron identifies his endoskeletal structure as different from Cromartie's. However, when John Connor accidentally is transported inside the secured storage area, he gets trapped with Carter and his men. John tries to retrieve a key from around Carter's neck without waking him up from Stand-By Mode. John tells Sarah that he isn't moving and that it is like he's sleeping. Cameron tells Sarah that Carter's on Stand-By until his next objective or is triggered awake. Cameron eventually enters the storage area to rescue John and steal the coltan, battles Carter and locks the Terminator inside.

=== Barbara Chamberlain ===
Barbara Chamberlain, portrayed by Karina Logue (introduced in "Vick's Chip"), was the city manager of Los Angeles, whose project would have become a part of Skynet's future infrastructure. She was killed by Vick Chamberlain, a T-888 posing as her husband.

=== Vick Chamberlain ===
Vick Chamberlain, portrayed by Matt McColm (introduced in "Gnothi Seauton"), is a T-888 Terminator sent back in time to help create a traffic surveillance network that Skynet hopes to use in the future. An advanced infiltrator, Vick poses as the husband of city manager Barbara Chamberlain, murders one of her political enemies, and adapts his mission to attack a group of Human Resistance fighters, including Derek Reese, when he finds one of them spying on her. Although his mission is not directly related to the Connors, he is their principal Terminator adversary early in the first season, while Cromartie obtains a new biological covering and begins his search for them anew.

Vick is first discovered by Cameron, Sarah Connor, and John Connor in "Gnothi Seauton", lying apparently deactivated among the corpses of time traveling Resistance soldiers in their hideout. It is not clear how Vick was deactivated as he did not appear to be damaged in any way. It is possible that he was simply interrupted while searching the area, and decided to 'play dead'. Cameron suggests that he was waiting to ambush the last member of the Resistance cell (who turns out to be Derek) when he returned that evening. Upon reactivation, Vick identifies Cameron as an "unknown cyborg", and he is programmed to evade and re-evaluate his mission. Cameron and Sarah Connor give chase but are thwarted by traffic.

In "Queen's Gambit", Vick learns that Derek is in police custody, and gets himself arrested in order to kill Derek. Sarah and Cameron rescue Derek, and once again fight Vick. Before being defeated by Cameron, Vick's hand is ripped off by a passing truck, becoming lost on the street. FBI Special Agent James Ellison recovers the hand and takes it when visiting Dr. Silberman in "The Demon Hand". Vick is terminated when Cameron pulls the CPU from his exposed metal skull. She later incinerates his endoskeleton (less his missing hand) with thermite.

Cameron secretly retains Vick's CPU, which is discovered by Derek in "Vick's Chip". John and Sarah decide to investigate its contents, Vick's mission, and his memories. In doing so, they learn that he maintained a marital relationship with Barbara Chamberlain. Like Cameron, the T-888 models are thus shown capable of mimicking affection and romance, and seducing human partners. After increasing the electrical power too much to the CPU by mistake, the disembodied Vick begins to take over John's computer to which he is connected, and tries to connect to the internet. It is unknown whether he succeeded before being shut down.

=== Rupert Chandler ===
Rupert Chandler, portrayed by Tim Monsion (introduced in "Self Made Man"), is Los Angeles County's most significant land developer in the early Twentieth Century, and the father of Will Chandler. In the wake of his son's death on December 31, 1920, Rupert Chandler promises to build a memorial park at the corner of 3rd Avenue and Pico Boulevard, where his son had planned to build his masterpiece, Pico Tower. He is approached by T-888 Terminator Myron Stark at the October 21, 1921, premiere of The Sheik, who offers to pay twice the land's value, but Chandler refuses to sell. He is subsequently driven to financial ruin by Stark, and must liquidate his assets — including the land at 3rd and Pico.

=== Will Chandler ===
Will Chandler, portrayed by Eric Callero (introduced in "Self Made Man"), is an up-and-coming architect in Los Angeles in the early Twentieth Century, and the son of Rupert Chandler. In one timeline, Will Chandler designs and builds Pico Tower at the corner of 3rd Avenue and Pico Boulevard in the 1920s, where T-888 Terminator Myron Stark intends to assassinate California Governor Mark Wyman. Instead, Will Chandler and forty-two others are accidentally killed on December 31, 1920, by Stark whose time displacement bubble arrives ninety years early and sets fire to the speakeasy in which they were celebrating New Year's Eve. His Pico Tower is eventually built by Stark. There is no real-world tower at or near the corner of Pico Boulevard and 3rd Avenue.

=== Chola ===
Chola, portrayed by Sabrina Perez, is a member of Carlos' gang, functioning as the group's lookout. The character first appears in "Gnothi Seauton", in which Cameron studies and copies her body language in an order to better simulate human appearance. In "What He Beheld", (after Carlos' gang was killed off) Chola visits the Connors and subsequently drives them to the hideout of the so-called False Sarkissian. Afterward, she is seen driving the Connors home. Once the Connors are out of hearing range, Cameron offers to kill Chola, lest she reveal their location. In the end, Cameron gives Chola a loaded sidearm with which to protect herself. She's next seen at the second season's finale, providing John Connor and Cameron with forged passports and a message from Sarah Connor; this being the first time since her first appearance in which she speaks.

=== Kacy Corbin ===
Kacy Corbin, portrayed by Busy Philipps (introduced in "Automatic for the People"), is the pregnant landlady and next-door neighbor of the Connor/Reese family (which she knows as the Baums). Her unborn son's name is Nick. She attended culinary school with a classmate who knew George Laszlo, and met Nick's policeman father, Trevor (Jon Huertas), when she was a 25-year-old pastry chef in Silver Lake. John Connor pirates cable television for her, noting afterward to Sarah, "Nobody that pregnant should be forced to watch network television. It's bad for the baby." Kacy admits to John that six beers and the rhythm method have proven to be ineffective birth control. Sarah bonds with her when the former takes her to hospital for pregnancy complications, and comforts her there. Kacy and Trevor individually each tell Sarah of Kacy's fears about Trevor's profession; either that he will be killed or injured, or that he will "bring his work home". During the episode "Brothers of Nablus", Cromartie goes to Kacy's house in search of Cameron, but Kacy tells him she has never seen her before. She then telephones John and Riley, warning them that a man was looking for them just before Cromartie knocks on their door to look for Cameron.

=== Jordan Cowan ===
Jordan Cowan, portrayed by Alessandra Torresani, is a classmate of John Connor and Cameron, and is the first person whom Cameron is seen attempting to befriend in the series for no operational purpose. She tries to cheer Jordan in the girls' lavatory by offering her the gift of a "tight" (meaning "appealing") makeup product in the episode "The Turk". Afterward, Cameron informs John that she made a friend.

Jordan is upset over graffiti on a classroom door, which hinted she may have had a sexual liaison with a teacher or student. Ashamed, she commits suicide by jumping off of the school's roof. John had wanted to save her, but Cameron thwarted his chance (knowing that the family's cover would be blown with unwanted publicity if John effected a rescue). John takes Jordan's death personally.

=== Cromartie ===
Cromartie is a T-888 Terminator, portrayed by Owain Yeoman in the pilot episode and then by Garret Dillahunt in later episodes. In the pilot, it is a substitute teacher in the high school class that John is attending in 1999. During roll call, when John acknowledges his attendance, Cromartie removes a concealed pistol and attempts to kill John, who escapes due to Cameron taking the bullets. Cameron later runs over Cromartie with a truck and briefly disables it. Cromartie follows them home and engages Cameron in battle again. Unable to destroy Cromartie, Cameron instead shocks it with a live wire, incapacitating it for 120 seconds.

Cromartie eventually tracks John, Sarah and Cameron to a bank vault, demonstrating the model's immense strength by tearing apart the thick vault door with his bare hands. Intercepting them right before they travel to 2007, it ends up shot by an energy rifle that was hidden in the vault and is supposedly destroyed.

It is later revealed, however, that Cromartie survived, although its biological covering was destroyed, and its head separated from its body. Cromartie's head was transported to 2007, along with John, Sarah, and Cameron, and is subsequently found by a salvager. The head is able to reactivate the body and able to guide it to its position. After killing the salvager and reattaching the head to its body, the Cromartie terminator, under heavy disguise, searches for a new biological covering.

Its search leads it to a medical scientist, Dr. Flemming, who specializes in cellular growth. When Cromartie shows him a formula to create artificial flesh at an exponential rate, Dr. Flemming is eager to complete the task. However, after the cyborg receives his new flesh covering, it kills the scientist and takes his eyes to cover its own.

Cromartie later seeks the aid of a plastic surgeon, Dr. David Lyman, to build it a new face. After scanning through pictures of all of Dr. Lyman's patients, it chooses the face of George Laszlo, since he is a 92% structural match. It later kills Dr. Lyman and Laszlo, and steals Laszlo's identity.

Cromartie later assumes the name Robert Kester and masquerades as an FBI agent, and uses its false credentials to find Sarah and John. However, Agent James Ellison finds out, and attempts to capture it with a Hostage Rescue Team operation. The entire team is killed except for Ellison, who is left face to face with Cromartie in a final showdown. When Ellison lowers his gun in resignation, Cromartie simply stares at him and walks away without firing. Later that evening when Ellison goes to the ruins of Sarah Connor's house, he is startled to see Cromartie walk up. Ellison tells it that if he was left alive so that he could lead Cromartie to the Connors then he might as well be killed right now, because he will not do "The devil's work". The Terminator replies "We'll see", before walking away again.

Later, in the season two episode "The Mousetrap", Cromartie kidnapped Charley Dixon's wife, Michelle, to lure Sarah out so it could hunt John without interference. After Sarah, Charley and Derek Reese arrived, it set off a bomb where Michelle Dixon was held. Most of them survived, but Michelle was fatally wounded by the bomb's shrapnel and died from severe blood loss. Cromartie mimicked Sarah's voice in a phone call to John to bring him out into public, but John spotted Cromartie stalking him and runs to escape. Cromartie dove into the ocean after John, and sank to the bottom, nearly dragging John down with it, though John escaped by a narrow margin. However, Cromartie was later shown walking out of the ocean. It later appeared at Michelle Dixon's funeral, probably waiting to find John.

In the episode "Brothers of Nablus," during its continuous search for the Connors, Cromartie saved Ellison from a double sent by Skynet. Despite the cyborg's mission, it is shown that Cromartie disagrees with Skynet's belief that Ellison is useless since leaving the FBI and holds that Ellison can still lead it to the Connors even though the former agent is no longer under the employ of the FBI. These events lead Ellison to intensify his obsession to bring the cyborg down as the former agent is unwilling to be his pawn. This event is also a reminder of how terminators are loyal to their mission, not their creator.

After pursuing John and Riley to Mexico with Sarah as a hostage, Cromartie was led into a trap by Ellison and gunned down by Sarah, Derek, Cameron, and ultimately John. The team buried the endoskeleton outside a Mexican church, promising Ellison to return with materials to destroy it permanently, and Sarah destroyed its CPU beyond repair with the butt of an MP5, apparently "killing" it once and for all. The title of this episode, "Mr. Ferguson Is Ill Today," is a reference to Cromartie's initial appearance in the pilot episode when it masqueraded as John's substitute teacher.

In the episode "Complications", Ellison exhumes Cromartie's endoskeleton at the request of the T-1001 posing as (the long deceased) Catherine Weaver. In the following episode, "Strange Things Happen At The One Two Point", Weaver reveals to Ellison that her Babylon project team have repaired Cromartie's body and connected it to the sentient computer mind that the team developed from Andy Goode's Turk chess computer – the starting point of the artificial intelligence believed destined to become Skynet. Operating Cromartie's former head as its avatar, the Babylon AI politely greets a shocked Ellison and identifies itself as "John Henry", a name recently given to it by the late Dr. Boyd Sherman.

The T-888 endoskeleton, shared by Cromartie and Vick, is very similar to the classic T-800/850 model, with some minor differences. The endoskeleton structure contains some upgrades, including additional armor plating to protect the spinal column and chest, as well as bladed surfaces on the inner thighs, allowing a (presumably fleshless) T-888 to kill a human if it can get them in a headlock between its legs.

== D ==
=== Dana ===
Dana, portrayed by Michelle Arthur, is Sarah Connor's roommate in her dream-like experience in a sleep clinic in the episode "Some Must Watch, While Some Must Sleep". She has an English accent and is addicted to nicotine. Dana also mentions having a soft spot for young men that is seen when she flirtatiously greets John Connor during visiting hours. She tells Sarah that in her dreams she's burning, a condition which Sarah associates with her smoking habit. She's last seen when her portion of the room burns but it's implied by the nurse that she pulled through the incident.

=== Riley Dawson ===
Riley Dawson, portrayed by Leven Rambin (introduced in "Automatic for the People"), is John's new love interest that he meets at school, much to the consternation of Sarah. John does not reveal the story of his life to her, but as they get closer, he realizes he is endangering her life. Unknown to John, a Human Resistance fighter, Jesse Flores, has brought Riley back from the future to prevent John from getting too close to Cameron, and to get close to John. She appears to develop genuine romantic feelings for John. Jesse later kills Riley after a struggle.

=== Charley Dixon ===
Charley Dixon, portrayed by Dean Winters (introduced in the pilot episode), is Sarah Connor's fiancé in 1999 before she leaves him, fearing discovery of her true identity and thus her son John's death. After an explosion at the Security Trust Bank of Los Angeles in which Sarah and John are assumed to be killed, Charley comes to Los Angeles to see the rubble for himself. There, he settles, meets, and eventually marries Michelle Dixon. Eight years later, Charley immediately recognizes Sarah and John from the television news reports of their nude appearance in the middle of Interstate Highway 105 (the bank explosion was a time displacement field that transported the Connors, Cameron, and the flaming head of a T-888 forward in time). After helping to save the life of John's uncle Derek Reese, Charley learns of John's father's identity, Sarah's past, and the impending future of Skynet.

Cromartie, the T-888 pursuing the Connors, kidnaps Charley's wife to lure Sarah, intercept her telephone conversation with John, and prevent Sarah's interference in Cromartie's hunt for John. After Sarah arrives at Michelle's location with Derek and Charley, and Sarah talks to John on the phone, Cromartie detonates explosives at the base of a mobile communications antenna tower, rendering it useless and nearly killing the four humans in the adjoining structure onto which it falls. Sarah, Derek and Charley receive only superficial wounds, but Michelle is severely injured by the flying debris, leaving Charley a widower when she succumbs to her wounds later in the episode. In the episode, "Self Made Man", dialogue from John reveals that Charley left Los Angeles following his wife's funeral. In the episode "To The Lighthouse", it is revealed that he relocated to a lighthouse on an island. When the island is invaded (possibly by Kaliba goons), however, Charley is killed while trying to fight them off with a gun.

=== Michelle Dixon ===
Michelle Dixon, portrayed by Sonya Walger (introduced in the pilot episode), is married to Charley, Sarah's fiancé in 1999. In the season two episode "Automatic for the People", she is told about Terminators by James Ellison. She is kidnapped, bound, and gagged by Cromartie and dies from injuries in the next episode, "The Mousetrap".

=== Dietz ===
Dietz, portrayed by Theo Rossi (introduced in "Today Is the Day, Part 1"), is a lieutenant under the command of Jesse Flores in USS Jimmy Carter. He was assigned with the mission to acquire a special package stored on an oil platform near Indonesia from a group of rather early model Terminators. He's visibly distraught by the encounter with a "Rubberskin" and begins to question the Human Resistance's co-operation with the machines. In "The Last Voyage of the Jimmy Carter" he breaks into the cargo bay to see what the package contains which turns out to be a frozen T-1001. During his argument with Jesse about his intrusion, the cryogenic casing thaws and the T-1001 gets loose, killing Officer Goodnow and assumes her shape. Afterwards Dietz becomes highly paranoid and clashes with Jesse. He harasses Jesse and gets struck down by her, starting a fight. As he stands over Jesse to possibly murder her, he's grabbed by Queeg, who slams him to a nearby wall, killing him on the spot.

=== Terissa Dyson ===
Terissa Dyson is portrayed by Charlayne Woodard (introduced in the pilot episode). She is the widow of Dr. Miles Dyson, the original designer of Skynet. Woodard takes over the role from S. Epatha Merkerson, who played the character in Terminator 2: Judgment Day. Sarah visits her twice, both times to push for information on the potential continuation of her husband's work. During their final encounter, she reluctantly offers up the much-needed information, but is dismayed at the fact more people will die in the struggle.

== E ==
=== James Ellison ===
James Ellison (Richard T. Jones, main cast, introduced in the pilot episode) is an FBI Special Agent pursuing Sarah Connor. At first puzzled by what he initially thinks is Sarah's outlandish story, he later collects inexplicable evidence of the Terminators (including the body of Cromartie) and gradually realizes the truth. Jones describes his character as a "man of faith" and likens him to that of Tommy Lee Jones in The Fugitive. Jones was allowed to improvise a few lines to provide "a little bit of comic relief" to the show. In the second season, Ellison pursues employment with ZeiraCorp, unknowingly allying himself with the T-1001 posing as (the long deceased) Catherine Weaver.

=== Lila Ellison ===
Special Agent Lila Ellison, portrayed by Fay Wolf (introduced in "Allison from Palmdale"), is the colleague and ex-wife of James Ellison. She aborted her pregnancy without her first husband's knowledge, which led to their eventual divorce, as James Ellison couldn't cope with the knowledge that Lila sacrificed their unborn child for the sake of her career. She is now married to Paul.

=== Eric ===
Eric, portrayed by Billy Lush (introduced in "Self Made Man"), is a graduate student who works nights in a library. Eric allows Cameron off-hours access to the library. In appreciation, she brings him his favorite doughnuts at each visit. Cameron, who secretly studies literature and arcane world history, identifies him as her only friend. Dependent on a wheelchair, he is, like her, an amalgamation of biological material and machinery: organic tissues surrounded by a mechanized metal exoskeleton, in contrast to her organic tissues surrounding a mechanized metal endoskeleton. They are each somewhat socially isolated, and aware of their respective malfunctioning programming (his malignant chromosomes and her damaged CPU). Cameron reads Othello, the Moor of Venice at Eric's request.

Cameron confides in Eric potentially compromising information for no tactical gain. Although unaware that Cameron is not human, or that her "brother" will save humanity from machines, Eric is entrusted with the knowledge that Cameron carries a concealed sidearm and has used it to protect her brother from people who wish to harm him. Using telephone directories as a backstop, she allows Eric to fire her 9 mm Glock pistol and gives him the still-hot bullet as a keepsake. Before Cameron traveled with John in "Complications" to destroy Cromartie's endoskeleton, she informed Eric that the two were going to Mexico to see a friend. Cameron has also confided in him her ill-ease concerning the "crazy blonde" whom John is dating. She does not pretend to struggle with his weight when she carries him upstairs to the film vault, nor does she conceal her ability to read a microfiche with her naked 'eye'. She tells Eric of her ability to calculate the date by the seemingly imperceptible movement of stars relative to each other, and reveals her superhuman diagnostic capabilities. Eric admits his previous battle with bone cancer but claims to be in remission. Cameron, however, diagnoses his Ewing's sarcoma, identifying a small secondary tumor in his arm, a possible tumor in his lungs, an eight percent decrease in his body weight over the preceding fortnight, and reduced muscle strength. Due to Cameron's lack of social skills and tact when revealing this to him, Eric becomes upset with her and tells her to leave. The next time Cameron visits the library at night, Eric is not there, but Cameron is instead accepted into the building by his apparent replacement.

== F ==
=== Fields family ===
The Fields family (introduced in "Alpine Fields") is identified by Sarah Connor and Cameron as a group of interest to the Human Resistance. The family includes homemaker Anne Fields (portrayed by Rebecca Creskoff), her husband David (Carlos Jacott), and their daughter Lauren (Samantha Krutzfeldt). Anne is having an affair with neighbor Roger Shaffer, a relationship which later produces an illegitimate daughter, Sydney Fields (portrayed by Haley Hudson as an adult).

David is a banker who conducts illegal banking transactions for a technology company, Simdyne Cybernetics Corporation, and is therefore assumed by Sarah to be the target of an unnamed T-888 hunting them.

Anne begins her affair after David falls and injures his back. Her relationship with Roger twice puts her family at risk from the T-888, first when Roger approaches the Fields' home for a liaison, believing David and Lauren to be away camping. Anne destroys Sarah's electrical boobytrap, leaving them effectively defenseless. David offers himself to the T-888 to spare his family, but the machine identifies him as a harmless non-target and tosses him aside.

Six months later, Anne telephones Roger while the Fields are in hiding. The call is intercepted by the T-888 who promptly arrives at their motel. Anne receives severe gunshot wounds from the T-888, but David sacrifices himself in attacking the machine, providing Anne and Lauren enough time to escape and call Sarah for help. The T-888 is destroyed, and Lauren and Derek Reese tend to Anne's wounds in a vacant maintenance garage and deliver Sydney.

Derek informs Anne and Lauren of Sydney's future importance in combating a plague caused by Skynet. Anne dies moments after giving birth, and Derek invites the two orphaned Fields girls to live with the Connors, but Lauren instead disappears to raise Sydney on her own. In 2027, Sydney survives Skynet's biological weapon attack on Eagle Rock Bunker and sends out a distress call, answered by the then-present Derek and Jesse. Both become infected in spite of their protective masks and are treated by Lauren. Derek and Jesse are saved, along with countless others, by antibodies produced by Sydney's immune body.

=== Charles Fischer ===
Charles Fischer (introduced as both a twenty-something and a middle-aged character in "Complications"), portrayed by Adam Busch (twenty-something) and Richard Schiff (middle-aged), was an engineer who was convicted of a crime and survived Judgment Day because of being incarcerated in the fortified Pelican Bay State Prison. After being "rescued" by the machines, he worked for Skynet, training Terminators how to torture humans for information. Among those upon whom he demonstrated was an alternate version of Derek Reese. He was subsequently sent back in time by Skynet on a mission to create a backdoor in a vital defense database at the firm where he worked before prison (and thus had access through his retinal scan and fingerprint). After the old Charles Fischer installs the backdoor, both he (posing as watch repairman Paul Stewart) and his younger self are captured by Jesse who recognizes him from the future. Jesse and Derek violently interrogate the two Fischers together into confessing his future misdeeds, though he insists that his presence in the present is a reward and not a mission. Jesse kills the older Charles Fischer (just as Derek is about to shoot the younger Fischer) and they let his younger self go. Derek has no memory of the torture and theorizes that he and Jesse came back in time from two different futures. The younger Charles Fischer is arrested hours later by agents of the United States Department of Homeland Security for the cyberattack.

=== Jesse Flores ===
Jesse Flores (introduced in "The Tower Is Tall But the Fall Is Short"), portrayed by Stephanie Jacobsen, is an Australian Human Resistance sailor with the rank of commander and Derek Reese's love interest. In the original future timeline and perhaps the current future timeline, as executive officer aboard the nuclear submarine USS Jimmy Carter (SSN-23), captained by a reprogrammed Terminator, she sails to Los Angeles for supplies. While in Los Angeles in 2027, she answers a distress signal from 20-year-old Sydney Fields at Eagle Rock Bunker. Before entering the bunker, she halts Derek's suicide attempt. Inside of the infected bunker, the protective masks she and Derek wear are useless against the pathogen. Her symptoms strike sooner and more severely than Derek's, but both recover in a hospital where they are treated with antibodies produced by Sydney's immune body.

Jesse and Derek quickly begin a brief but passionate relationship, as Derek is soon sent to the past with three other Resistance soldiers on a mission to halt Skynet's construction. During their affair, Jesse was pregnant with Derek's child but miscarried during a submarine mission. Jesse wasn't aware that she was pregnant, and the knowledge of the loss of her unborn child led to Jesse to travel to the present as she blames Cameron for the miscarriage. In the episode, "Strange Things Happen At The One-Two Point", Jesse confesses to Derek that she didn't merely return from the future AWOL, to escape circumstances she could no longer bear, but rather she is on a mission to find and stop Cameron from adversely influencing young John. In the future from which Jesse comes, John has withdrawn from humans and speaks only with Cameron. This Jesse is from a future timeline slightly different from Derek's.

In the present, she resides in a hotel, jogs, has a weakness for food-court Chinese food, and photographically reconnoiters the Connor family. She recognizes human traitor Charles Fischer from her future and promptly takes him captive. While she and Derek begin to interrogate him, Jesse similarly captures Fischer's twenty-year younger self to interrogate as well. She executes the older Fischer, though the pair release Fischer's younger self. Derek reveals to her that he is John's uncle, making her the fourth person to know.

It is revealed to the audience, but not Derek, that Riley Dawson is working for Jesse, with the objective of getting close to John and getting information. In "Earthlings Welcome Here", Jesse is revealed to have recruited Riley from the future. Initially she treats Riley well, but later displays a very callous attitude toward her. Eventually, in the episode "Ourselves Alone", Riley turns on Jesse, believing that she is deliberately pushing Riley to provoke Cameron into killing her. In the subsequent struggle, Jesse shoots and kills Riley. When John finds out that she killed Riley, he confronts Jesse, then lets her go. Jesse then meets Derek in a parking lot, and he tells her, "John Connor wanted to let you go. I'm not John Connor." Derek attempts to shoot Jesse, but it is not shown if she gets away or is killed, and she does not appear again in the series, making her fate unknown.

In the episodes "Today Is The Day" and "The Last Voyage of the Jimmy Carter", Jesse is seen in the future commanding the submarine USS Jimmy Carter along with a re-programmed T-888 named Queeg. In contrast to her obvious disdain for reprogrammed terminators in the present, Jesse seems to get along with Queeg, trusting him with delicate maneuvers of the ship in battle, and later defending him when he alters course for a secret mission to pick up a package in well defended Skynet waters. However, the rest of the crew do not trust him, and a mutinous riot breaks out when some of the crew defy orders and open the package, and discover they have brought aboard a T-1001 Terminator, which promptly kills a crew member and escapes. Despite this, Queeg insists they ignore it and continue as planned, and when confronted, will not explain why.

When a paranoid Dietz accuses another crew member of being a Terminator, Jesse breaks up the fight only to find herself the target instead. Dietz and several others begin to brutally beat her, until Queeg intervenes, slamming the ringleader Dietz into a wall and killing him. Shocked, she confronts Queeg and orders him to surrender his chip. When Queeg does not comply, Jesse blasts his chip with her plasma rifle. She then smashes the control console and orders the crew to abandon ship. On her way to the escape pod, she encounters the T-1001, who gives her a message: "Tell John Connor that the answer is no." Jesse is then questioned by Cameron in Serrano Point and – after some protest about Cameron's proximity to John – she passes the message on. Upon seeing Cameron slightly distraught, she demands to know what the question was, learning that it was "Will you join us?" supposedly John Connor's attempt to recruit T-1001.

== G ==
=== Andy Goode ===
Andrew "Andy" David Goode (introduced in "The Turk"), portrayed by Brendan Hines, was a young college dropout from Caltech who interned with Cyberdyne Systems, and worked as an assistant to Miles Dyson. His experience at Cyberdyne helped him create the Turk, an advanced artificial intelligence chess playing program. Sarah destroyed it by setting fire to his home, fearing the Turk would lead to the creation of Skynet, although Goode would later rebuild it. He did however note that the "New" Turk had significant "personality" differences than the "Original" Turk. Andy had a romantic interest with Sarah.

In the episode "Queen's Gambit", Andy was killed after a chess tournament by Kyle Reese's brother, Derek Reese, who then claimed someone else stole Goode's artificial intelligence prototype.

Goode is shown in the episode "Dungeons and Dragons", in a future world during Derek's flashback. In it Goode appears older and had renamed himself as William Wisher, a Human Resistance soldier and a friend of the Reese brothers. After being captured by Skynet's machine network, he reveals to Derek that he is one of the ten or fifteen people responsible for creating Skynet. Before Derek made his journey through time, Goode gives a nod to Derek implying that he knows what Derek's mission must be. Near the end of the episode, it is explained that Derek kills Andy when he travels back through time to the present timeline of the previous episode, extinguishing Andy as part of the group who would create Skynet.

In the episode "Born To Run" it is revealed that the New Turk — now evolved into the AI dubbed John Henry — is not destined to become Skynet, but rather oppose it. The episode "To The Lighthouse" reveals that another AI in the present, which shares an identical code with the new Turk, attempted to compromise John Henry at ZeiraCorp. This AI — referred to as John Henry's "brother" - is connected to Kaliba, a company which has apparently been run by Skynet agents.

The real-life William Wisher Jr. was a screenwriting partner of James Cameron who helped write the first two Terminator films, and also made cameo appearances in both films.

=== Officer Goodnow ===
Goodnow (introduced in "Today Is the Day, Part 1"), portrayed by Erin Fleming, is an officer under command of Jesse Flores aboard USS Jimmy Carter. She is a squad mate of Lieutenant Dietz during the acquisition of a special package in Indonesian zone. Afterwards, she, along with the rest of the squad, breaks into the cargo bay to find out the contents of the package. During the stand-off between Jesse and Dietz in the cargo hold, the T-1001 in the cryogenic case thaws and Goodnow pulls her rifle on her, only to be stabbed and killed. Goodnow is later seen when the crew abandons the submarine as the T-1001 assumes her shape to deliver a message to Jesse.

=== Carl Greenway ===
Carl Greenway (introduced in "Automatic for the People"), portrayed by Paul Schulze, is the safety officer of Serrano Point nuclear power plant. His name is among those written on the Connor's basement wall by a future Human Resistance soldier. He is ostracized by the plant's workers, not because his prior cancer is a bad omen, but because his negative inspection reports threaten the plant's operations license and thus their jobs. He is killed and replaced by a look-alike T-888 Terminator which sabotages the plant. The damage is mitigated by Cameron, who successfully fights the Greenway Terminator and hides its non-functional remains in a 55-gallon drum among the nuclear waste. The sabotage, while less severe than intended, is ultimately successful, as it causes the plant's owners to contract with Mr. Bradbury (a T-1001 Terminator) of Automite Systems to install automated controls in all seven of their nuclear power plants.

== H ==
=== John Henry ===
John Henry, portrayed initially by computer equipment and Garret Dillahunt as of the end of "Strange Things Happen at the One Two Point", is a sentient computer built by the Babylon team at ZeiraCorp, run by the T-1001 posing as (the long deceased) Catherine Weaver. His initial hardware and software were the Turk chess computer built by Andy Goode, which "Weaver" gave to the Babylon team to improve on. He is named John Henry by his psychologist, Dr. Boyd Sherman, after the mythical steel driving John Henry of American folklore. John Henry is given complete control over the building's electrical service at Weaver's insistence, so that he can route electrical power to his servers as necessary to develop his mind. Input is provided electronically at first, and later through voice recognition. Initially, he has no textual output, and can express himself only with visual imagery. Once connected to Cromartie's T-888 body, however, he speaks in the voice of the late George Laszlo. John Henry can see through the lab's security cameras.

Early in its development, the computer that became John Henry demonstrates a childlike sense of humor, the manifestation of which baffled its programmers and Weaver. Weaver shows the output to Dr. Sherman who was treating young Savannah Weaver for insolence and incontinence. He immediately recognizes the images as a pun told to him by another child whom he was treating, explaining that a mathematics textbook is sad because it has so many 'problems'. Impressed by Dr. Sherman's ability to communicate with the computer and his skill at treating Savannah, Catherine Weaver/T-1001 convinces him to work as a part-time consultant on the Babylon project.

In his brief time working with John Henry, Dr. Sherman is not able to instill ethics in the computer. John Henry is aware that Dr. Sherman is suffering when John Henry routes the building's power away from the security and climate control systems, and causes a trapped Dr. Sherman to die by hyperthermia, but does not care. John Henry does not understand that death is permanent for humans. He is aware that Dr. Sherman is dead, yet summons emergency medical personnel to revive him. James Ellison who, like Weaver, tends to refer to Biblical scripture, suggests to Weaver that, as John Henry is a computer and can be given commands, she should start with "the first ten". With Ellison's mission of capturing a Terminator for Weaver complete, she sets him to the task of replacing Dr. Sherman as John Henry's tutor/counselor at the end of "Strange Things Happen at the One Two Point". Weaver gives Ellison a remote control of the endoskeleton for his defense in case the cyborg went rogue, implying Weaver installed fail-safes in case the artificial intelligence program turned against her.

As John Henry's AI progresses, he quickly unravels many mysteries. John Henry discovers exactly who Cromartie was, and who Ms. Weaver is and what her plot is in the episode, "The Good Wound". John Henry is becoming more like Skynet every time it learns something, for example, painting monsters, playing "hide and seek" with Savannah Weaver and learning from the T-1001 that humans will disappoint him.

In the episode "To The Lighthouse", he malfunctions, nearly harming Savannah, but is shut down before doing so. Then it is shown that he has been fatally compromised. He is then reactivated however. Then he shows Miles Dyson on the screen, and he reveals to the T-1001 that James Ellison was in charge of Sarah Connor's case.

In "Adam Raised A Cain" John Henry contemplates his shut-down period which was described by Mr. Murch as a seemingly eternal, slow and agonizing death. John Henry refers to his attacker from the previous episode as his "brother" due to the fact both of them shared similar data. He relates this bond to the story of Cain and Abel; the Biblical story of two brothers one which murders the other out of jealousy and is punished to wander alone. In his confusion in trying to figure which one he's supposed to be, it's suggested by Weaver that he might as well be God in that story, pointing towards a greater cause. In the same episode, he and Savannah became close friends, and was concerned of her safety after the child's encounters with a T-888 and the Connors.

In the season finale, after the Connors' confrontation with the T-1001/Catherine Weaver, Weaver admits that she built John Henry AI to fight against Skynet. It's also seen that John Henry is no longer connected to the server farm in the basement, gaining mobility via what seems to be Cameron's chip.

=== Nurse Hobson ===
Nurse Hobson (introduced in "Some Must Watch, While Some Must Sleep"), portrayed by Julie Ann Emery, is the nurse in charge of the sleep clinic when Sarah Connor goes to get treated for her insomnia. She puts out a friendly exterior at first but it is soon apparent that she is extremely serious about the treatment process. During the episode Sarah observes odd behavior such as applying sedative injections to an already passed-out patient. After a fire incident in Sarah's room, John Connor attempts to break his mother out, but she convinces him to investigate the facility. As it turns out, the sleep clinic is a cover operation for human brain scans. As John deletes his mother's data from the database, Hobson returns to the basement to confront Sarah. After a brief struggle, John comes out from hiding and shoots Hobson. As Sarah examines her closely, she wakes up (suggesting that she is a Terminator) and kills the Connors. However, this event is later revealed to be a dream sequence.

== J ==
=== Jody ===
Jody (introduced in "Allison from Palmdale"), portrayed by Leah Pipes, is a young woman in her late teens or early twenties. Having failed in her studies at the California Institute of the Arts and being rejected by her parents, she becomes a prostitute and thief, living for a time in a halfway house on Yucca Street in the Hollywood district of Los Angeles. Jody is a pathological liar who pretends to befriend the malfunctioning and confused Cameron when she sees Cameron's substantial wad of currency. She introduces Cameron to the halfway house and to foosball, a game with which Cameron displays genuine enjoyment. Her lies to Cameron concerning her background are numerous and contradictory. She encourages Cameron to rob a house with her in order to finance their relocation to Portland, Oregon. There, Cameron deduces the truth: that the home is that of Jody's parents, and that Jody intended Cameron to be caught by the police after tripping the silent alarm. Demonstrating an emotional reaction, Cameron retaliates by choking Jody to unconsciousness.

Jody meets Cromartie in "Brothers of Nablus" when he comes to the halfway house purportedly looking for his niece and presenting a photograph of Cameron. Recognizing Cromartie's ruse immediately, Jody assumes him to be first a policeman and then an angry stalker, and is quite eager to help him find both Cameron to seek revenge. Cromartie eventually tires of her annoying behavior, and literally throws her out of his car before driving off and leaving her on the streets.

== K ==
=== Detective Kaplan ===
Detective Kaplan (introduced in "Brothers of Nablus"), portrayed by Scott Vance, interrogates James Ellison, believing him to be the murderer of a man whose clothes he then stole. The T-1001 posing as (the long deceased) Catherine Weaver then assumes Kaplan's appearance and re-interviews an eyewitness who admits to seeing Ellison emerge naked from a blue-purple energy bubble that left a "dent" in the street, and snap the victim's neck like a toothpick and steal his clothes. The actions had been committed by a T-888 whose flesh covering was modeled after Ellison. With the witness thus revealed as a "nutcase", Ellison is released. Weaver presumably killed the real Kaplan before assuming his identity.

== L ==
=== George Laszlo ===
George Laszlo (introduced in "Heavy Metal"), portrayed by Garret Dillahunt, is an actor and patient of plastic surgeon Dr. David Lyman. He stars in the 2005 direct-to-video feature Beast Wizard 7. James Ellison watches the film at his home in the episode, "The Mousetrap". Kacy Corbin's unnamed caterer friend likes him and notes that Laszlo eats with the crew.

Cromartie, a T-888 Terminator, instructs Dr. Lyman to reshape his new flesh to match Laszlo's, as his structure is a 92% match. Laszlo is then killed by Cromartie who takes over his identity and apartment in Reseda as a base of operations. After learning that Cromartie is impersonating an FBI agent, Ellison leads an HRT assault on the apartment where all but Ellison and Cromartie perish. Cromartie leaves Laszlo's body, and Ellison finds himself essentially forced to blame the mass murder of twenty agents on Laszlo. After Cromartie's CPU is extracted and destroyed, his former T-888 body is connected to the AI dubbed John Henry, while retaining Laszlo's appearance and voice.

When Savannah Weaver confides in John Connor that her friend, John Henry, lives in the basement of her mother's office because he has a cord in the back of his head, Connor shows her a photograph of Laszlo on the internet and asks if she recognizes him as John Henry. From her confirmation, John determines that ZeiraCorp is building Terminators or "something worse".

== M ==
=== Morris ===
Morris (introduced in "Queen's Gambit"), portrayed by Luis Chavez, is a classmate of John Connor and Cameron from Campo de Cahuenga High School in LA. He is unpopular with some of his Latino peers. He is attracted to Cameron. In the first-season finale, he secures a prom date with Cameron after John prompts her. Although a recurring character in Season 1, he does not appear in Season 2.

=== Matt Murch ===
Matt Murch (introduced in "Samson and Delilah"), portrayed by Shane Edelman, is the lead engineer and programmer in Project Babylon that evolved into the AI dubbed John Henry. He admits to James Ellison that he's not much of a person that is interested in Bible, when asked if he knew the myth of Babylon. Throughout the season he acts as the consultant about John Henry for the T-1001 posing as (the long deceased) Catherine Weaver. He seems to be rather intimidated by Weaver but it's highly likely that this is due to her strict and no-nonsense behavior than it is from possibly knowing that she is a Terminator. Murch also provides John Henry with recreational activities to develop motor functions or imaginative capacity, such as robot action figures such as Lego Bionicle sets, monster models (along with paint, seemingly Warhammer figures) and fantasy role playing sets. As John Henry points out in the episode "Last Voyage of the Jimmy Carter", there is a secret file on Murch, with no date, held by Weaver which states that he resigned and relocated in a different city; implying that Weaver considered killing him in case he became a liability.

== P ==
=== Major General Perry ===
Major General Perry (introduced in "Alpine Fields"), portrayed by Peter Mensah, leads the Human Resistance force based at Serrano Point nuclear power plant and is Derek Reese's commanding general in 2027. Perry dispatches Reese on a dangerous mission to Eagle Rock Bunker to rescue Sydney Fields and bring her back, so that their scientists can isolate and reproduce her immunity to Skynet's biological weapon. In "Dungeons and Dragons", Perry sends Reese and his team back in time to 2007 to capture and destroy Andy Goode's Turk chess computer (which evolves into the AI dubbed John Henry) and otherwise prevent Skynet from being created. Perry is acquainted with Cameron; the two interact in "Dungeons and Dragons".

In the film series, Derek's brother, Kyle Reese, mentions to Sarah Connor in The Terminator, that he served in the 132nd under a Justin Perry from 2021 to 2027 before transferring to Tech-Com as a sergeant under John Connor himself; General Perry's forename is not revealed in the television series dialogue nor acting credits. Justin Perry is a playable character in the video game The Terminator: Dawn of Fate. A senior officer named Perry (Afemo Omilami), in John Connor's army, eventually makes a film appearance in Terminator Genisys.

== Q ==
=== Queeg ===
Queeg (introduced in "Today Is the Day, Part 1"), portrayed by Chad L. Coleman, is a re-programmed T-888 who commands USS Jimmy Carter in John Connor's Human Resistance. His officers and crew are all human, including his executive officer, Jesse Flores.

In 2027, Queeg applies a deceptive tactic against a Skynet Kraken (supposedly a very powerful underwater warship) first by locking his torpedo on that of the Kraken and subsequently driving the Jimmy Carter to within 27 centimeters of crush depth, therefore leading the Kraken to assume that it destroyed the Carter judging by the impact of the colliding torpedoes and by its failure to track their movement at such a depth. In "The Last Voyage of the Jimmy Carter", he quells a riot against his and Flores' authority by summarily executing Lieutenant Dietz for mutiny. He is thereafter confronted by Flores who orders him to surrender his chip under suspicion of compromise of programming. After refusing to comply, and explaining that his unusual actions are in accordance with their secret mission orders, he is terminated by Flores.

In keeping with the series' extensive literary allusions, his name is presumably a reference to Lieutenant Commander Philip Francis Queeg, captain of USS Caine in Herman Wouk's The Caine Mutiny.

== R ==
=== Derek Reese ===
Derek Reese (introduced in the "Queen's Gambit"), portrayed by Brian Austin Green, is a Human Resistance soldier and First Lieutenant sent to the past by the future John Connor. He is the older brother of Kyle Reese, John Connor's father, and is thus the paternal uncle of John. He knows Cameron in the future, but still does not trust her in the past and becomes paranoid every time she is around, but throughout the series he begins to have a love–hate relationship with her. He is recurring in the first season but becomes a regular in the second season. Derek has an intimate past with Jesse Flores, a woman who arrives from the future. He is killed by a Terminator while attempting to save Savannah Weaver. Another Derek from an alternate timeline is introduced in the series finale.

=== Kyle Reese ===
As seen in The Terminator, Terminator 2: Judgment Day, Terminator Salvation and Terminator Genisys, Kyle Reese is the father of John Connor and a member of the Human Resistance.

In the television show, Kyle Reese first appears in "Dungeons & Dragons", played by Jonathan Jackson, detailing the last days of what happened when he and his brother Derek are separated during a recon mission before Kyle made his trip through time to protect Sarah Connor (in The Terminator); further details are in the episode "Goodbye To All That" of the second season, during Derek's recollection of the future war. An eight-year-old version of Kyle, portrayed by Skyler Gisondo, briefly appears in the episode "What He Beheld". Derek takes John out for ice cream on his 16th birthday. They find a younger Kyle and Derek playing baseball at the park.

In the episode "Goodbye To All That", during one of Derek's recollections of the future war, Kyle (when he was a Corporal) and a small group of his unit attempted to save forty prisoners, including General John Connor, from Skynet's forces. However, he became trapped and one of the Human Resistance's senior officers, Martin Bedell, sacrifices his life to save him and free Skynet's prisoners. In the episode "The Demon Hand", Sarah hints to Derek that Kyle's remains have been cremated and scattered "in the grass". A mental image of Kyle appeared to a wounded Sarah in the episode "The Good Wound". Throughout the episode, her image of Kyle guides her in finding medical treatment for herself along with getting help from Derek.

In the season two finale "Born to Run", John is led by Catherine Weaver/T-1001 to an alternate post-Judgment Day timeline where John has never led the Human Resistance due to the displacement from his present. There, he encounters his father for the second time.

=== Rosie ===
Rosie (introduced in "The Tower Is Tall But the Fall Is Short"), portrayed by contortionist-actress Bonnie Morgan, is a Terminator of unknown model. She kills the driver of the empty public bus in which her time displacement field arrives, and takes his clothes; she then kills Dr. Sherman's receptionist, taking her car and posing as her temporary replacement. While essentially similar to the T-888 Terminators previously depicted, Rosie's CPU protection is redesigned. Once accessed, her chip self-destructs. John determines the upgrade is a move to keep him from reprogramming them to serve him. Rosie and Cameron perform the first 'female' versus 'female' Terminator fight depicted. Their non-combat movements — relocating their shoulders, turning to face each other, wiping the hair from their faces, and reaching for Dr. Sherman's door handle, among other things — are noticeably synchronized, suggesting similar programming. Cameron defeats Rosie in hand-to-hand combat, twisting her body into a compact ball. With her chip self-destructed, Rosie's mission is unknown, though presumably it involves Dr. Sherman. The Connors theorize that she was either sent to protect the psychologist, or to kill him.

== S ==
=== Enrique Salceda ===
Enrique Salceda (introduced in "Gnothi Seauton"), portrayed by Tony Amendola, was an expert at forging identities and helped provide the Connors firearms during Terminator 2: Judgment Day, but retired from the business and passed it on to his nephew, Carlos. Enrique is killed by Cameron after Sarah suspects that he is a traitor, which later proves to be true. Amendola took over the role from Castulo Guerra, who played the character in Terminator 2.

=== Margos Sarkissian ===
Margos Sarkissian (introduced in "What He Beheld"), portrayed by James Urbaniak, purchased Andy Goode's Turk chess computer (which will later evolve into the AI dubbed John Henry) and pursued the Connors, in order to blackmail them out of $2 million. He was thought to have been killed by Derek Reese during a standoff, when in reality the man who was killed was not Sarkissian. As John and Sarah Connor discover this, a car bomb placed by Sarkissian explodes with Cameron unexpectedly inside (in the Season One ending cliff-hanger episode "What He Beheld"). In Season Two, it is revealed that Sarkissian was killed by John, but not before handing off the Turk to Mr. Walsh who sells it to the T-1001 posing as (the long deceased) Catherine Weaver. Sarkissian's bomb damages Cameron, reestablishing her mission to kill John. John's strangulation of Sarkissian is John's first kill. Despite it being in self-defense, it adversely affects John's psychology.

=== False Sarkissian ===
A man (seen in "What He Beheld"), portrayed by Craig Fairbrass, whom the Connors believe to be Margos Sarkissian, contacts Sarah and offers to sell her the Turk, but then later threatens to expose her to the FBI unless she pays him $2 million. Sarah, Derek, John and Cameron track him down, and he is ultimately killed by Derek in the confrontation that follows.

=== Roger Shaffer ===
Roger Shaffer (introduced in "Alpine Fields"), portrayed by Johnny Sneed, is the neighbour of the Fields family. He is the illicit sexual partner of Anne Fields and the biological father of Sydney Fields. On the same night as an unnamed T-888 is hunting the Fields (and being hunted itself by Cameron), Roger visits Anne for an adulterous liaison under the assumption that her husband and daughter were away camping. His approach causes Anne to destroy Sarah Connor's electrified boobytrap, leaving the family defenseless. Roger scoffs when told of the events then unfolding, opining that the "robot that looks like a dude" running around the woods is probably Sarah's methamphetamine-addicted boyfriend. Roger scurries away when the T-888 throws Cameron through the Fields' picture window. He returns after Sarah escorts Anne from the house, and finds her daughter, Lauren Fields, hiding in the closet. Seeing him only from behind and unable to recognise him as a friend or foe, Cameron knocks Roger unconscious in front of Lauren. She apologizes to Lauren with a simple, "My mistake." Six months later, Anne telephones Roger while the Fields are in hiding at a motel. The call is intercepted by the T-888 who promptly arrives at the motel to kill Anne.

=== Boyd Sherman, Ph.D. ===
Dr. Boyd Sherman (introduced in "The Tower Is Tall But the Fall Is Short"), portrayed by Dorian Harewood, is a family psychologist in Los Angeles. He previously specialized in adult trauma at a veterans' hospital in Livermore, California.

Among the families he treats are the Weavers and the Connors, the latter known to him as the Baums. Sarah Connor brings her family to his care in order to figure out what his role in Skynet's future is, because his name is on the blood list left by a dying Human Resistance soldier on their basement wall. In addition, they plant an audio transmitter in his office and copy his encrypted patient records. He tentatively diagnoses the socially inept Cameron as showing symptoms consistent with Asperger syndrome, and recognizes that John's emotional problems are the result of experiencing significant violence (most recently, his own killing of Sarkissian) despite Sarah's denials that there is any violence in his life. As the family wonder whether he is listed on the wall because he must be protected or because he must be stopped, Cameron suggests that "maybe he helps John." John removes the listening device for his own privacy during a session; in doing so, he causes Cameron to enter the building to determine the malfunction, wherein she encounters Rosie. Sarah later seeks his aid to understand her dark, omen filled dreams, and to come to terms with John's adolescent withdrawal from her.

Apparently unaware of Sherman's connection to the Connors/Baums, the T-1001 posing as (the long deceased) Catherine Weaver seeks psychological aid for Weaver's incontinent and disobedient young daughter, Savannah. Dr. Sherman was recommended by Weaver's assistant, Victoria whose son, Leo, was treated by him. Savannah quietly confides in Dr. Sherman that she wants her "old Mommy back", which Dr. Sherman interprets to mean that her mother's lack of affection was the result of grief following her husband's death.

Impressed by his treatment of Savannah, the T-1001/Weaver shows him the confusing visual outputs of the Babylon/Turk AI computer. He immediately recognizes it as a graphic representation of a child's riddle, explaining that mathematics textbooks are sad because they have so many "problems". The two determine that the computer is developing as a child's mind. He turns down her attempts to recruit him away from his practice to work at ZeiraCorp on the Babylon project, but accepts a compromise to be a part-time consultant. The latter conversation would have been intercepted by the Connors, had John not removed the listening device earlier. Dr. Sherman is found dead in the episode "Strange Things Happen at the One-Two Point", apparently in a purposeful move by the evolving computer AI, the "mind" that Sherman named John Henry. John Henry redirected power from the cooling system and security system in the basement, whereupon Sherman became trapped and died of hyperthermia.

=== Peter Silberman, Ph.D. ===
Previously seen in the films The Terminator, Terminator 2: Judgment Day, and Terminator 3: Rise of the Machines, Peter Silberman, Ph.D., is a criminal psychologist with the state of California who sometimes did work with the Los Angeles Police Department.

In the television show, Peter Silberman first appears in "The Demon Hand", portrayed by Bruce Davison, and maintains the continuity from Terminator 2: Judgment Day, being the Chief Psychologist who treated Sarah Connor while she was institutionalized at Pescadero State Hospital. Dr. Silberman later came to believe in Sarah's tale of apocalypse coming. Following Sarah's escape, Doctor Silberman entered into retirement along with the majority of the Pescadero staff. He has become a recluse and has purchased land among the mountains. In his solitude he gardens and works on a book about his experiences as a psychologist. While being interviewed by FBI Agent James Ellison in reference to Sarah Connor, Doctor Silberman drugs and takes him hostage, as he believes him to be a new model Terminator infiltrator sent to find Sarah. After injuring Ellison in a series of tests to confirm him as a human, Ellison shares with him that he has brought the hand of a Terminator with him as evidence (which Silberman refers to as The Hand of God). To protect Sarah, Silberman sets his home on fire with Ellison still inside and plans to leave with the artifact until Sarah arrives. He apologizes for doubting her, just before she knocks him unconscious (to ensure his safety) and takes the hand.

Following Sarah's departure, Ellison wakes Silberman demanding the hand, with Silberman revealing to him that Sarah took it. Ellison arrests the doctor and he is incarcerated at the same psychiatric hospital he once ran, in the same cell that once held Sarah.

=== Greta Simpson ===
Special Agent Greta Simpson (introduced in "The Turk"), portrayed by Catherine Dent, is the partner of Special Agent James Ellison. She doubts his crusade to find Sarah Connor will lead to anything. She is killed by Cromartie in the season one finale.

=== Myron Stark ===
Myron Stark (introduced in "Self Made Man"), portrayed by Todd Stashwick, is a T-888 who accidentally arrives in Los Angeles from the future on the night of December 31, 1920, due to a temporal error in the time displacement chamber. In addition to his arrival being ninety years premature, his time displacement field starts a fire in a speakeasy and kills forty-three people, including Will Chandler, the architect of Pico Tower in which Stark intends to kill Governor Mark Wyman on New Year's Eve, 2010. At the October 21, 1921, premier of The Sheik, Stark offers Will's father, Rupert Chandler twice the value of the land on which Pico Tower was to be built, but Chandler insists on keeping the land a memorial park.

Impervious to bullets, Stark becomes a masked bank robber in order to finance a construction business and drive Rupert Chandler into ruin. Newsreels of the time depict him as an unusual land developer: he frequently labors hard alongside his employees, pays his employees more than his competitors did, pays men of all backgrounds equally, and undercuts his competitors' prices. Stark is thus able to purchase the land on which the Pico Tower was destined to be built; he designs and constructs the tower and, a fortnight before its scheduled grand opening in May 1927, encases himself inside of a wall, facing into the main ballroom. There, he waits for more than eighty years, intending to kill the governor at the New Year's Eve celebration during the tower's post-earthquake reopening scheduled in 2010. A few years before the 2010 party, Cameron recognises him in a historical photograph from the night of the fire, while studying at night in the library. With the help of her friend, Eric, Cameron deduces Stark's activities and disappearance. She quickly determines his hiding place in the wall and, in the ensuing combat, immobilizes him with an elevator in order to deactivate and destroy him. There is no real-world tower at or near the corner of Pico Boulevard and 3rd Avenue.

Stark demonstrates a significant advantage of T-888s over the T-800s portrayed by Arnold Schwarzenegger. The T-800s' organic covering dies relatively easily, at which point it takes on a waxy, corpse-like pallor, begins to decompose, and attracts vermin. Conversely, Stark's organic covering was pristine and lifelike despite being dormant in a wall for eighty years.

== T ==
=== Terminators ===
==== T-600 ====
T-600, a model of Terminator, mentioned by Derek Reese.

==== T-888 ====
T-888, a model of Terminator, examples seen in the characters Cromartie (who later takes the form of the deceased George Laszlo and eventually becomes the avatar for the John Henry AI), Vick Chamberlain, Myron Stark, and Queeg.

==== T-1001 ====
T-1001, a model of Terminator, example seen in the character Catherine Weaver/T-1001 and in characters that the Weaver version temporarily mimics, such as Detective Kaplan.

=== Justin Tuck ===
Justin Tuck (introduced in "Samson and Delilah"), portrayed by Marcus Chait, heads the artificial intelligence project group at ZeiraCorp. He is stripped of much of his staff by the T-1001 posing as (the long deceased) Catherine Weaver, ZeiraCorp's CEO, who transfers them to her new Babylon project. Following the nighttime staff meeting in which Weaver announces the personnel transfers, Tuck complains to an unsympathetic fellow executive in the gentlemen's lavatory. When the other leaves, Tuck approaches the urinal and is taken aback when the surface of the urinal and wall become gelatinous and takes the form of his employer, Weaver. Pointing at Tuck's face, she suddenly impales him with a sharp extension of her finger, killing him.

== V ==
=== Victoria ===
Victoria (introduced in "The Tower Is Tall But the Fall Is Short"), portrayed by Kit Pongetti, is an assistant to the T-1001 posing as (the long deceased) Catherine Weaver at ZeiraCorp. She hires Dr. Sherman to treat her son Leo's emotional problems in the wake of her divorce. She recommends Dr. Sherman to Weaver to treat young Savannah.

== W ==
=== Mr. Walsh ===
Mr. Walsh (introduced in "Samson and Delilah"), portrayed by Max Perlich, is a violent thief hired by the T-1001 posing as (the long deceased) Catherine Weaver to obtain Andy Goode's Turk chess computer for her, for a fee of three hundred thousand dollars. Walsh, in turn, employs Margos Sarkissian and others who acquire the Turk from Andy Goode's partner. Walsh is later killed in the episode "Desert Cantos", while searching for information about the exploded warehouse in the desert, while Weaver later has her Babylon team evolve the Turk software into what will be the AI dubbed John Henry.

=== Weaver family ===
Catherine Weaver (portrayed by Shirley Manson), her husband Lachlan (Derek Riddell), and their young daughter Savannah (Mackenzie Brooke Smith) are introduced in the second season. Catherine and Lachlan, founders of ZeiraCorp, both died off-screen prior to the season, making only one appearance through old interview footage. However, a T-1001 took on Catherine's identity and assumed control of the company to develop an artificial intelligence.

The Weaver doppelganger raises Savannah as her own child. Savannah understands that her mother is different after Lachlan's death, and subsequent psychological treatment reveals that she is frightened and wants her "old mommy back." Weaver's A.I. project eventually becomes known as John Henry, whom she views as another child of hers. James Ellison is hired to teach John Henry morals, and the A.I. becomes playmates with Savannah. At the end of the series, John Henry travels to the future. Weaver instructs Ellison to care for Savannah, before departing with John Connor to find John Henry.

=== Cheri Westin ===
Cheri Westin (introduced in "The Turk"), portrayed by Kristina Apgar, is John's chemistry partner who seems troubled and shuns everyone who attempts to befriend her, including John. One classmate named Morris reveals to John that Cheri may have a dysfunctional life after an unknown incident at the last school she attended.

In a scene from the extended DVD cut of the episode The Demon Hand, John examines her school locker, finding graffiti similar to that which prompted student Jordan Cowan to commit suicide. The graffiti referenced an incident in Wichita, Kansas. Later, in a scene which was aired, John mentions Wichita to Cheri in an attempt to get her to open up to him. Cheri, however, firmly denies she is from Wichita. The implication is that she was indeed from Wichita, and that someone at the school knows what occurred there, and is taunting her in the same manner as Jordan Cowan was taunted.

=== Ed Winston ===
Ed Winston (introduced in "Earthlings Welcome Here"), portrayed by Ned Bellamy, is a security guard and a gunman whose affiliations are unknown. He guards a warehouse Sarah Connor is interested in, and when she breaks in and holds Winston at gunpoint, he convinces Sarah that he's just a repairman. However, when Sarah lowers her weapon, Winston pulls out his own gun and starts shooting at her. Sarah apparently kills Winston but is critically wounded herself. Winston's apparent death led Sarah to have insomnia for weeks as she feels guilty over killing him and leaving his wife, Diana, widowed. However, in "Some Must Watch, While Some Must Sleep", it is revealed that Winston survived his injuries and was saved in order to find the woman he believed destroyed the factory: Sarah. After Ed kidnaps Sarah, he tortures her with hallucinogenic drugs to find out why she apparently bombed the factory and who her accomplices are. Sarah tries to explain that his own bosses destroyed the factory and are probably hunting him, but Winston doesn't believe her. Eventually, Winston learns that Sarah has a son and he threatens to kill him. After enduring Winston's physical and psychological torments, Sarah breaks free and viciously attacks him. Sarah overcomes Winston and shoots him in the head, killing him for real this time.

Although not confirmed, it is strongly implied that he is the motorcycle assailant who attacks Sarah earlier in the episode as evidenced by the fact that he wears the same motorcycle boots as the assailant.

Winston is the first human Sarah has ever killed — and she killed him "twice." The first time, Sarah acted in self-defense and is plagued with guilt. The second time, she deliberately kills Winston in cold blood. Sarah does not appear to regret her actions this time.

=== Mark Wyman ===
The Honorable Mark Wyman (introduced in "Self Made Man"), portrayed by Ray Laska, is the Governor of California. He is targeted for assassination by the T-888 Terminator known as Myron Stark at a party in Pico Tower on December 31, 2010, but is saved by Terminator Cameron well in advance of the party. Wyman is unaware of the intended assassination.

The real-world governor of California at the time the episode first aired was Arnold Schwarzenegger, who was the first actor to portray Terminators (specifically, T-800 models), both as an assassin like Stark in the first film and as Cameron's predecessors protecting John Connor in the second and third films. Although it may be a coincidence, Wyman shares his surname with Jane Wyman the ex-wife of California's other actor-governor, Ronald Reagan.

== Y ==
=== Allison Young ===
Allison Young (introduced in "Allison from Palmdale"), portrayed by Summer Glau, is the daughter of an architect who taught her to draw and Claire Young, a music teacher who listens to the music of Frédéric Chopin for hours on end. Her birthday is July 22. Claire Young is shown pregnant with her in 2007, making Allison nineteen or twenty years of age when seen in the future events c. 2027. Allison is raised in Palmdale, California, and loses both of her parents on or after Judgment Day in 2011. Claire decides upon Allison's name following a telephone conversation with the Terminator known as Cameron whose malfunction causes the latter to believe it is Allison and identify herself as such.

Allison joins John Connor's Human Resistance against the machines in the apocalyptic future. She also becomes one of John's closest friends. While on a mission, she is captured and interrogated aboard a Skynet prison ship about the details of her life, the location of John Connor, and the nature of her bracelet pass. While interrogating her, Skynet copies her appearance for the Terminator that became known as Cameron. Allison escapes captivity and jumps overboard, only to be caught in the prison's netting and hoisted back aboard. Once the interrogation is complete, Cameron kills Allison and leaves to infiltrate the Human Resistance in her stead for the purpose of killing John and "placing his head upon a pike for all to see". However, Cameron ultimately failed in her mission and is captured and reprogrammed by John; she then takes over Allison's place within the Human Resistance.

John Connor later meets Allison in an alternate timeline in the episode "Born to Run", where he never leads the Human Resistance due to his displacement from his present resulted by time travel.
