= Josh Friedman =

American screenwriter

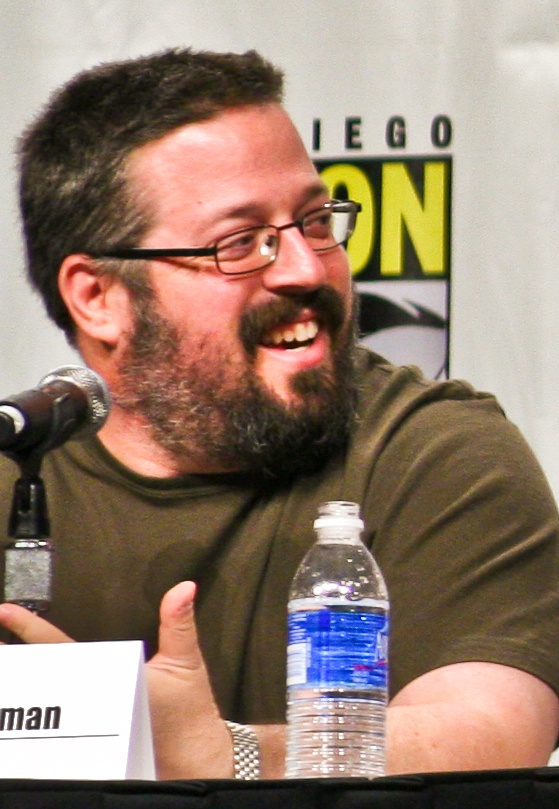
- Friedman at San Diego Comic-Con in February 2008
- Born: February 14, 1967 (age 59); United States
- Occupations: Screenwriter, television producer
- Writing career
- Genres: Science fiction, thriller, drama

Joshua Friedman (born February 14, 1967) is an American screenwriter and television producer. He is best known for his work on the science fiction genre, including on the series Terminator: The Sarah Connor Chronicles, the Steven Spielberg's 2005 film adaptation of H. G. Wells' War of the Worlds, Terminator: Dark Fate (2019), and Kingdom of the Planet of the Apes (2024). He also wrote the neo-noir mystery The Black Dahlia (2006) and co-wrote James Cameron's Avatar film sequels and the Marvel Cinematic Universe superhero film The Fantastic Four: First Steps (2025).

== Career ==
Friedman has developed several television pilots, including the TNT series Snowpiercer, based on Bong Joon-ho's film of the same name. Friedman departed the program in January 2018 due to creative differences with the network, and he was replaced by Graeme Manson. Friedman later claimed that he felt pressured to leave by TNT due to a "radical difference in vision", with an implicit threat of blacklisting should he fail to comply. Following his departure, pilot director Scott Derrickson refused to return for reshoots in solidarity with Friedman. Friedman was attached to Foundation, based on Isaac Asimov's Foundation series.

== Personal life ==
Friedman married artist Christine Albrecht-Buehler in 2002. They have one child. He is a cancer survivor.

Friedman maintained a blog, "I find your lack of faith disturbing" from 2005 in 2010. He was responsible for a publicity boon surrounding the film Snakes on a Plane, after being offered to work on the script, and insisting on the B movie-esque title.

== Filmography ==
=== Film ===
Year	Title	Director	Notes
1996	Chain Reaction	Andrew Davis	Co-wrote story with Arne L. Schmidt and Rick Seaman
2005	War of the Worlds	Steven Spielberg	Co-writer with David Koepp
2006	The Black Dahlia	Brian De Palma	
2019	Terminator: Dark Fate	Tim Miller	Co-wrote story with James Cameron, Charles H. Eglee, David S. Goyer and Justin Rhodes
2022	Avatar: The Way of Water	James Cameron	Co-wrote story with Cameron, Rick Jaffa, Amanda Silver and Shane Salerno
2024	Kingdom of the Planet of the Apes	Wes Ball	
2025	The Fantastic Four: First Steps	Matt Shakman	Co-writer with Eric Pearson, Jeff Kaplan and Ian Springer
2025	Avatar: Fire and Ash	James Cameron	Co-wrote story with Cameron, Rick Jaffa, Amanda Silver and Shane Salerno

=== Television ===
Year	Title	Functioned as				Notes
Year	Title	Writer	Producer	Creator	Developer	Notes
2008–09	Terminator: The Sarah Connor Chronicles	Yes	Yes	Yes	Yes	4 episodes (Writer)
2011	Locke & Key	Yes	Yes	No	No	Failed pilot
2012	The Asset	Yes	No	No	No	Failed pilot
2012	The Finder	Yes	No	No	No	1 episode (Writer); Also consultant producer
2014	Crossbones	Yes	Yes	No	No	1 episode (Writer)
2017	Emerald City	Yes	Yes	Yes	Yes	3 episodes (Writer)
2020–24	Snowpiercer	Yes	No	Yes	Yes	
2021–present	Foundation	Yes	Yes	Yes	No	
