= Sonic the Hedgehog (film) =

2020 film by Jeff Fowler

- Theatrical release poster
- Directed by: Jeff Fowler
- Written by: Pat Casey; Josh Miller
- Based on: Sonic the Hedgehog by Sega (Note: Sonic the Hedgehog was developed by Sonic Team, published by Sega, directed and programmed by Yuji Naka, designed by Hirokazu Yasuhara, and illustrated by Naoto Ohshima.)
- Produced by: Neal H. Moritz; Toby Ascher; Toru Nakahara; Takeshi Ito
- Starring: James Marsden; Ben Schwartz; Tika Sumpter; Natasha Rothwell; Adam Pally; Neal McDonough; Jim Carrey
- Cinematography: Stephen F. Windon
- Edited by: Stacey Schroeder; Debra Neil-Fisher
- Music by: Tom Holkenborg
- Production companies: Original Film; Marza Animation Planet; Blur Studio
- Distributed by: Paramount Pictures
- Release dates: January 25, 2020 (Paramount Pictures lot); February 14, 2020 (United States); June 26, 2020 (Japan)
- Running time: 99 minutes
- Countries: United States; Japan
- Language: English
- Budget: $85–90 million
- Box office: $320 million

Sonic the Hedgehog (Note: Known in Japan as Sonic the Movie (Japanese: ソニック・ザ・ムービー, Hepburn: Sonikku za Mūbī)) is a 2020 action-adventure comedy film based on the Sonic video game series. It was directed by Jeff Fowler (in his feature film directorial debut), written by Pat Casey and Josh Miller, and stars James Marsden, Ben Schwartz, Tika Sumpter, Natasha Rothwell, Adam Pally, Neal McDonough, and Jim Carrey. Schwartz voices Sonic, a blue hedgehog who can run at supersonic speeds, who teams up with the town sheriff Tom Wachowski (Marsden) to stop the mad scientist Dr. Robotnik (Carrey) from taking over the world.

Development for a Sonic film began in the 1990s but did not leave the planning stage until Sony Pictures acquired the film rights in 2013. Fowler was hired in 2016. After Sony put the project in turnaround, Paramount Pictures acquired it in 2017. Most of the cast signed on by August 2018. Principal photography took place between September and October that year in Vancouver and on Vancouver Island, with a release date set for November 8, 2019. Following negative reaction to the film's first trailer, wherein Sonic appeared to look like a real hedgehog, Paramount delayed the film by three months to redesign Sonic to more resemble his look in the video games.

Sonic the Hedgehog premiered at the Paramount Pictures studio lot on January 25, 2020. It was theatrically released in the United States on February 14 and in Japan on June 26, and received mixed reviews. It set the record for the biggest opening weekend for a video game film in the United States and Canada and grossed $320 million worldwide, becoming the sixth highest-grossing film of 2020 and the highest-grossing video game film adaptation in North America. It became the first installment in the Sonic the Hedgehog film series, and was followed by Sonic the Hedgehog 2 (2022), Sonic the Hedgehog 3 (2024) and a television miniseries, Knuckles (2024).

== Plot ==
Sonic, a young anthropomorphic blue hedgehog who can run at supersonic speed, is ambushed by an echidna tribe for his power. His guardian, an anthropomorphic owl named Longclaw, gives him a bag of golden rings that open portals to distant locations. She tells Sonic the best way to stay safe is to stay hidden before using a ring to send him to Earth while she stays behind to hold off the echidnas, sacrificing herself. Ten years later, Sonic enjoys a secret life in a forest cave near the rural town of Green Hills, Montana, but longs to make friends. He idolizes the local sheriff, Tom Wachowski, and his wife, Maddie, unaware that the pair plans to relocate to San Francisco as Tom intends to accept a job at the San Francisco Police Department.

One night, Sonic grows lonely while playing baseball alone. While he is running at unusually high speeds to clear his mind, his frustration causes him to accidentally trigger an electromagnetic pulse that causes a massive power outage across the Pacific Northwest. The U.S. Department of Defense enlists the services of eccentric roboticist and scientific genius Doctor Robotnik to determine the cause of the outage. Realizing his cover has been blown, Sonic reluctantly plans to leave Earth and live on a different planet that only contains mushrooms.

Robotnik discovers Sonic's footprint in the forest and, determining that the print is not of any animal found on Earth, uses his drones to track Sonic, who escapes his cave and hides in the Wachowskis' shed to leave for the mushroom planet. However, Sonic causes a commotion as he prepares to leave, causing Tom to investigate. Discovering Sonic in his shed, Tom shoots him with a tranquilizer dart, causing Sonic to accidentally open a portal to San Francisco and drop his bag of rings through the portal to the Transamerica Pyramid's roof before passing out. After Sonic recovers, Tom agrees to help him, and the two flee when confronted by Robotnik, who falsely labels Tom a domestic terrorist. The two bond as they make their way to San Francisco, with Tom relating to Sonic's desire for friends. Sonic creates a bucket list in a western-themed bar where Tom helps him complete several entries, culminating in a bar fight.

Meanwhile, Robotnik comes across one of Sonic's quills, discovering that the power in it has the potential to fuel his machines, and becomes obsessed with capturing Sonic to harness his power. Sonic and Tom fight off several mechanized drones sent by Robotnik, but Sonic is injured. Arriving in San Francisco, Tom brings Sonic to Maddie, who is staying at her sister Rachel's house, to revive him. While Tom explains the situation to Maddie, Sonic receives a new pair of sneakers from Maddie's niece Jojo.

Sonic, Tom, and Maddie then head to the roof of the Transamerica Pyramid and recover the rings as Robotnik arrives in an advanced hovercraft powered by the quill. Sonic fights off Robotnik's drones and sends Tom and Maddie back to Green Hills with one of his rings; however, Robotnik uses the quill's power to match Sonic's speed and pursues him across the world, incapacitating him in Green Hills. Tom and the townsfolk intervene, and Tom acknowledges Sonic as his friend, causing Sonic to regain consciousness and maximum strength. Sonic defeats Robotnik by destroying his hovercraft with his powerful spin attack and, with help from Tom, sends him through a ring portal to the mushroom planet.

Following the incident, Tom and Maddie decide to stay in Green Hills and let Sonic live with them. Commander Walters, the Vice Chairman of the Joint Chiefs of Staff, congratulates them for saving the world and assures them that all evidence of the event has been erased, including records of Robotnik's existence. Meanwhile, on the mushroom planet, Robotnik, having lost his sanity and still in possession of Sonic's quill and equipment salvaged from the remains of his hovercraft, plots his return to Earth to seek his revenge. On Earth, a two-tailed Fox (Note: Identified offscreen as Tails.) emerges from a ring portal in search of Sonic.

== Cast ==
=== Voice ===
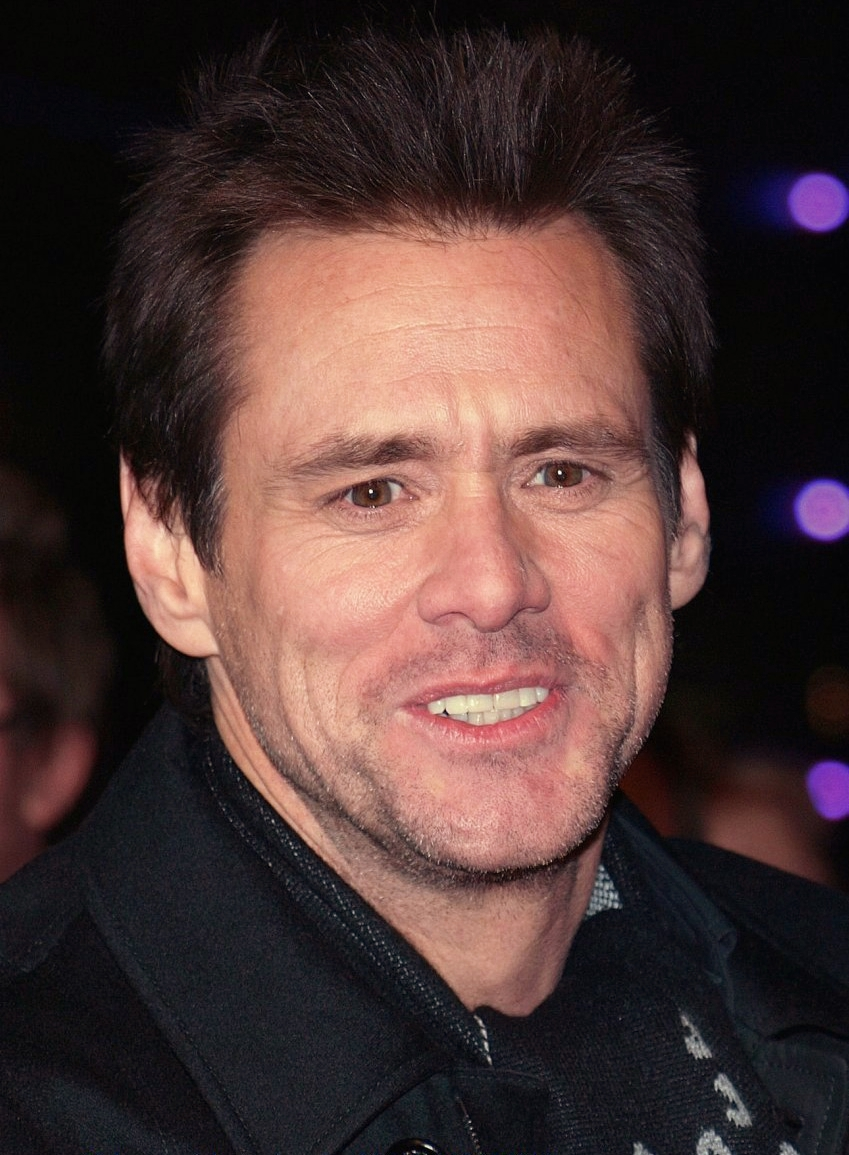
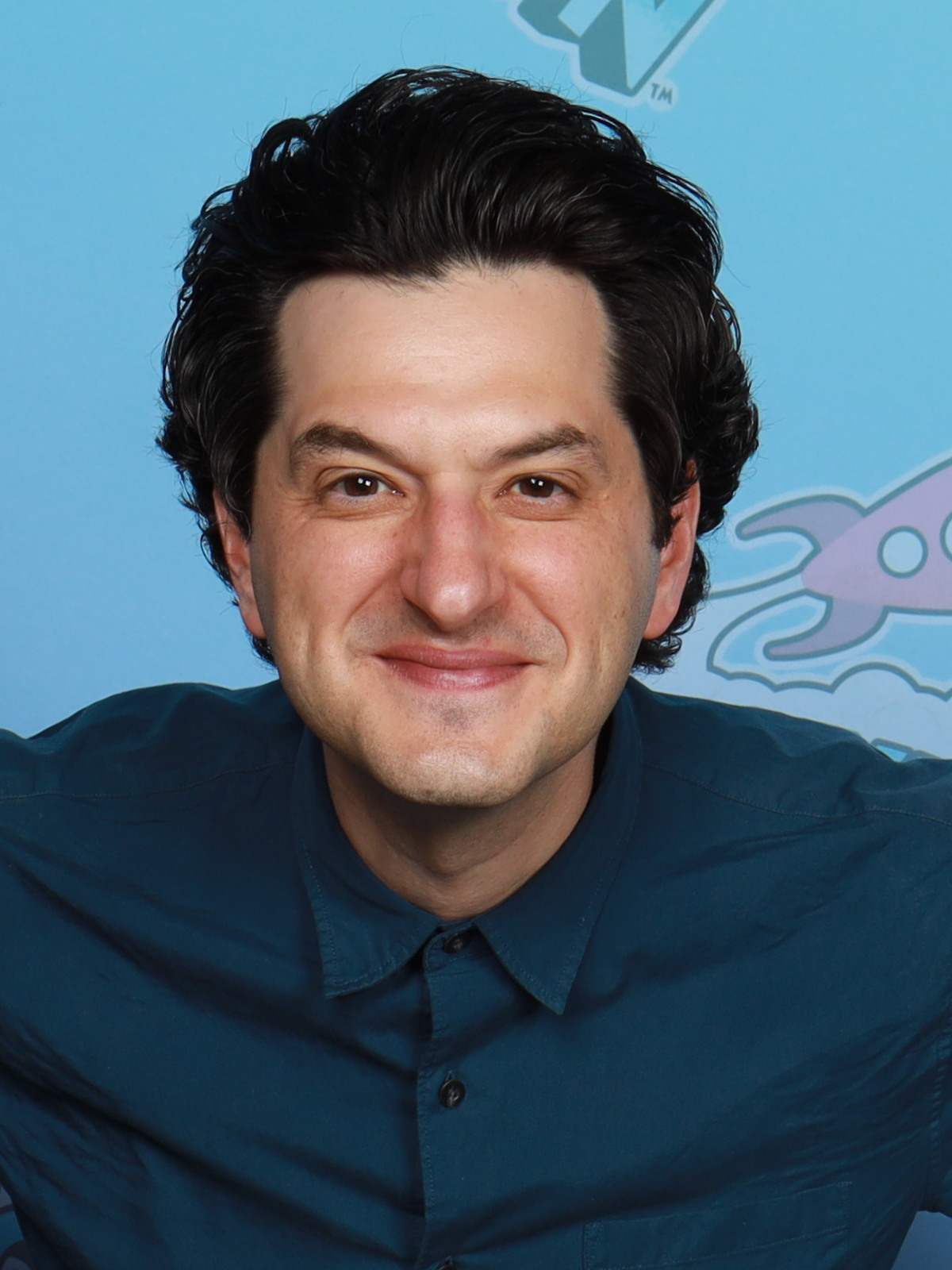
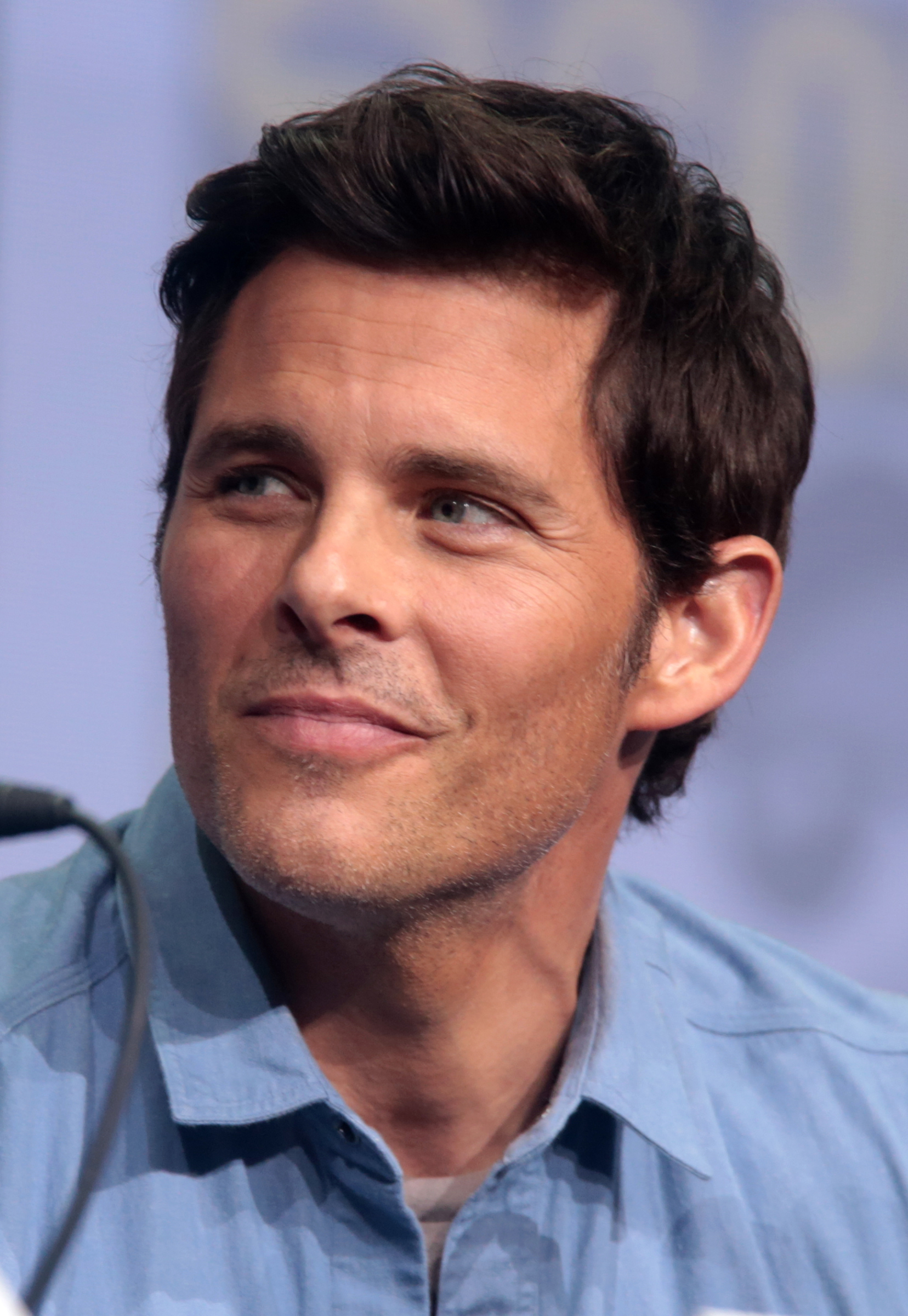
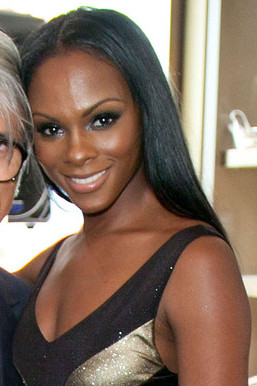
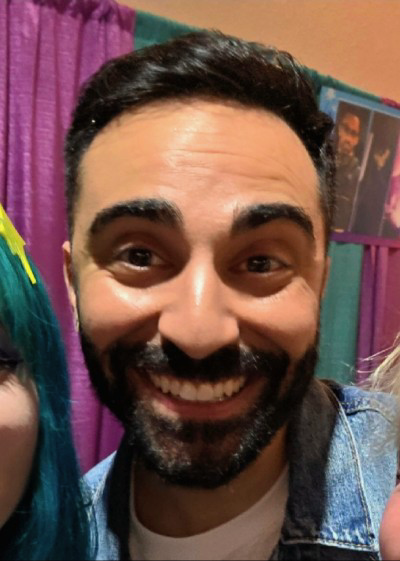
Jim Carrey playing Eggman and Ben Schwartz (pictured in 2025) plays the voice of Sonic the Hedgehog, meanwhile James Marsden, Tika Sumpter, and Lee Majdoub plays Tom, Maddie and Agent Stone
- Ben Schwartz as Sonic the Hedgehog, an anthropomorphic blue hedgehog with superhuman speed who finds himself on the run from Robotnik and the United States government. Schwartz also provided the facial motion-capture for Sonic.
  - Benjamin L. Valic voices Young Sonic.
- Donna J. Fulks as Longclaw, an anthropomorphic brown owl who was Sonic's caregiver as a child

Additionally, Colleen O'Shaughnessey reprises her role from the games in an uncredited role as Miles "Tails" Prower, an anthropomorphic yellow-orange two-tailed fox, in the mid-credits scene.

=== Live-action ===
- Jim Carrey as Dr. Robotnik, a brilliant robotics expert and mad scientist who works with the American government, covets Sonic's abilities, and plans to exploit them for his own personal gain, leading him to become Sonic's arch-nemesis. Carrey compared his character to his portrayal of the Riddler in Batman Forever (1995), saying: "I wouldn't put one against the other. I think they'd be a great team. But you know, it's like Robotnik and every supervillain basically comes from a place of neglect with a feeling of absolute worthlessness that manifests itself in magnificent creations that are designed to control the world, put their brand on everybody, and maybe even get inside your bloodstream with some nanotechnology occasionally."
- James Marsden as Tom Wachowski, the sheriff of Green Hills who becomes a father figure to Sonic and aids him in his quest
- Tika Sumpter as Maddie Wachowski, a veterinarian and Tom's wife, who helps him and Sonic stop Robotnik
- Lee Majdoub as Agent Stone, a government agent who works for Robotnik as an assistant
- Adam Pally as Wade Whipple, a dimwitted deputy sheriff in Green Hills and Tom's closest loyal friend
- Natasha Rothwell as Rachel, Maddie's older sister who dislikes Tom and frequently attempts to encourage Maddie to leave him
- Melody Nosipho Niemann as Jojo, Rachel´s daughter and Tom and Maddie´s niece
- Tom Butler as Commander Walters, the Vice Chairman of the Joint Chiefs of Staff who orders Robotnik to investigate the power outage caused by Sonic
- Neal McDonough as Major Bennington, a soldier tasked with assisting Robotnik in his efforts to capture Sonic
- Frank C. Turner as Crazy Carl, a conspiracy theorist who seeks to prove Sonic's existence Turner previously portrayed the character in Kickin' It Old Skool.
- Garry Chalk as the U.S. Navy Chief of Staff. Chalk previously voiced Grounder and Robotnik in Adventures of Sonic the Hedgehog and Sonic Underground respectively.
- Michael Hogan as the Air Force Chief of Staff
- Peter James Bryant as Army Chief of Staff
- Shannon Chan-Kent as a roadhouse waitress

== Production ==
=== Prior efforts ===
Development for a film adaptation of the Sonic the Hedgehog video game franchise began in 1993 during production of DIC Entertainment's television show Adventures of Sonic the Hedgehog. Michealene Risley, the newly appointed consumer products director who helped license Sonic for Adventures, negotiated with several Hollywood producers. Sega of America CEO Tom Kalinske was wary of damaging the brand, citing the commercial and critical failures of the Super Mario Bros. (1993) and Street Fighter (1994) films. Despite Kalinske's concerns, Sega was enthusiastic. In August 1994, Sega struck a development deal with Metro-Goldwyn-Mayer and Trilogy Entertainment Group, with Pen Densham as executive producer.

MGM and Sega hired Richard Jefferies, an associate of Risley from her days at Marvel Comics, to write a film treatment. At the time, Sega was developing the video game Sonic X-treme (which was canceled in late 1996) for its next console, the Sega Saturn, and asked Jefferies to feature the Saturn in the screenplay. Jefferies' treatment, Sonic: Wonders of the World, was submitted in May 1995. While the draft received a positive response among MGM and Sega executives, Sega COO Shinobu Toyoda suggested Kalinske replace Robotnik with a meaner villain. MGM canceled the project after a failed attempt to revive it at DreamWorks. Jefferies suggested that the film was scrapped as both Sega and MGM wanted a higher share of the profits, while Densham said it followed creative differences between Sega and Trilogy.

During the late 1990s, Ben Hurst attempted to revive and properly conclude the animated Sonic the Hedgehog television series, in which he worked as a writer. After failing to tell the conclusion in an Archie Sonic Super Special comic, and after being dissuaded from attempting to continue the series as a network show during an interview with Robby London, a DIC Entertainment executive, he decided to pursue telling the rest of the animated series' story in a feature film. London put Hurst in contact with a Sega executive interested in the idea. Hurst was contacted by Ken Penders, writer of the Archie Comics' Sonic the Hedgehog comic book series, who had been alerted of Hurst's plans. Though Hurst told him his strategy and offered to include him in his effort, Penders allegedly told Sega that Hurst was trying to co-opt the franchise, leading Sega to dismiss Hurst and his proposal. Hurst would attempt to get the film made once more from 2005 to 2006, but this ultimately fell through.

In September 2003, Penders pitched his own concept for a Sonic film, Sonic Armageddon. In Penders's words, the film would have been an origin story and a series reset, resolving the plot threads which began in the animated Sonic show and continued in Archie's comic series. The project was dropped in 2007 due to a corporate upheaval and the death of Sega licensing manager Robert Leffler, who had supported Penders.

=== Development ===
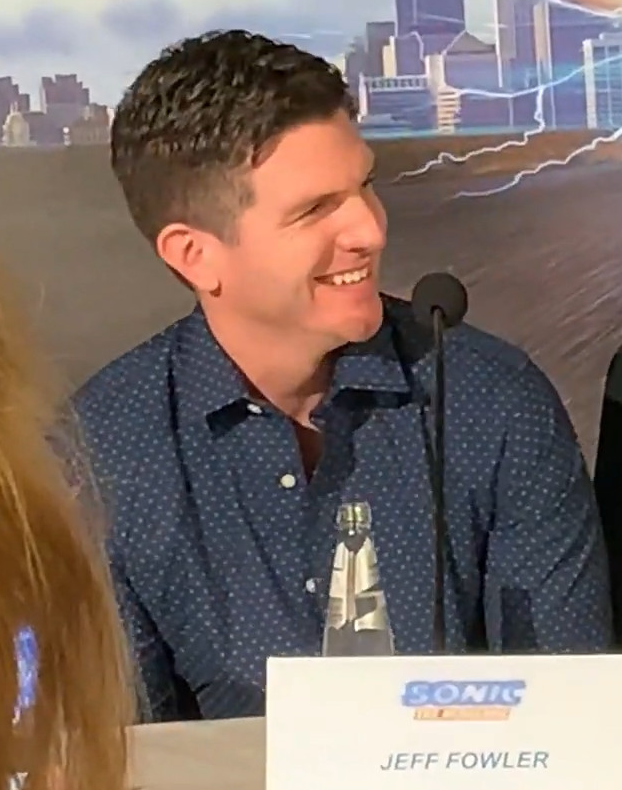
Sonic the Hedgehog was the directorial debut of Jeff Fowler (pictured in 2020); Fowler had previously done work on cutscenes for Shadow the Hedgehog.

In 2013, Sony Pictures Entertainment acquired the rights to produce and distribute a Sonic film. On June 10, 2014, a live-action animated film was announced as a joint venture between Sony Pictures's Columbia Pictures and Marza Animation Planet, a Japan-based subsidiary of Sega Sammy Holdings which had produced CGI cutscenes for several Sonic games. It would be produced by Neal H. Moritz by his Original Film banner alongside Takeshi Ito, Mie Onishi, and Toru Nakahara, and written by Evan Susser and Van Robichaux. In February 2016, Sega CEO said the film was scheduled for 2018. Hajime Satomi, Blur Studio's Tim Miller, and Jeff Fowler were hired in 2016 to develop the film; Fowler would direct it in his feature directorial debut, while Miller would serve as executive producer. Blur Studio previously produced cutscenes for the games Shadow the Hedgehog (2005), for which Fowler did animation and directed cutscenes, and Sonic the Hedgehog (2006). Patrick Casey, Josh Miller, and Oren Uziel were writing the screenplay, while Casey and Miller wrote the story, however, the former two received sole writing credit while Uziel went uncredited.

On October 2, 2017, Paramount Pictures announced that they had acquired the rights after Sony put the film in turnaround. Almost all of the production team remained unchanged. Coincidentally, Paramount and Sega had once been sister companies under Gulf and Western Industries; Gulf and Western sold Sega's assets in 1984. In February 2018, it was announced that the film would be released in November 2019. During production the film used the working title "Casino Night", named after one of the stages in the Sonic games. Early drafts featured Sonic's Super Sonic form from the video games; the ideas were latterly discarded, as Fowler felt that "it didn't make sense to obviously bring in the Super Sonic thing just yet" and instead wanted to focus on the origins of Sonic and Robotnik's relationship. Casey and Miller reportedly described the film as not faithful to the game, while producer Toby Ascher favored their buddy comedy approach.

=== Casting ===
In May 2018, it was reported that Paul Rudd was in talks for a lead role as Tom, "a cop who befriends Sonic and will likely team up to defeat Dr. Robotnik"; however, this was later denied by Paramount. A day later, it was announced that James Marsden was cast in an undisclosed role but later revealed to be Tom Wachowski. In June, Tika Sumpter was cast as Tom's wife Maddie, with Jim Carrey cast to play the villain, Dr. Robotnik.

In August, Ben Schwartz joined the cast to voice Sonic. This marked a rare occasion in which the character would not be voiced by Roger Craig Smith, who voices Sonic in most incarnations since 2010. Schwartz, a fan of the original video games, was chosen for the role after Fowler and Miller cast him for a test reading as they pitched the project to several studios. Having enjoyed his performance, they officially cast Schwartz as the voice of Sonic. Adam Pally and Neal McDonough were added to the cast later that month. Debs Howard and Elfina Luk joined the cast the following November. Riff Raff was cast in an undisclosed role but was cut from the film.

=== Filming ===
Principal photography began in mid-September 2018 and ended in Vancouver, Ladysmith, and Vancouver Island on October 16, 2018. Key production scenes were also filmed in Liwa Oasis, United Arab Emirates. During filming, Schwartz was unavailable, so a stand-in performed alongside Marsden.

=== Visual effects and design ===
The visual effects are provided by Moving Picture Company (MPC), Marza Animation Planet, Blur Studio, Trixter, and Digital Domain. The production team created a live-action version of Sonic using CGI, adding fur, new running sneakers, two separate eyes, and a more human like physique. They used Ted, the living teddy bear from the Ted films, as a reference to insert a CGI character into a real-world setting. Executive producer Miller said: "It would be weird, and it would feel like he was running around nude if he was some sort of otter-like thing. It was always, for us, fur, and we never considered anything different. It's part of what integrates him into the real world and makes him a real creature." According to Miller, Sega was "not entirely happy" with the design of Sonic's eyes.

On May 2, 2019, in response to the criticism, Fowler announced on Twitter that Sonic would be redesigned. The film was delayed from its original release date of November 8, 2019, to February 14, 2020, as a result. Artist Tyson Hesse, who worked on previous Sonic the Hedgehog media and ultimately served as co-producer on the sequels, was brought on to lead the redesign. Sonic was given larger and differently colored eyes, new sneakers, white gloves, and a less humanlike body to better resemble Sonic's video game design. Sonic was redesigned by Marza Animation Planet. The redesign added an estimated $5 million to the production budget, took around five months, and was achieved without overtime.

== Music ==
In February 2019, Tom Holkenborg, who previously collaborated with executive producer Miller on Deadpool (2016), was hired to compose the score. The soundtrack was released alongside the film on February 14, 2020, in both digital and physical formats. Riff Raff, who had a role in the film but was cut due to controversy against him, appears on the soundtrack. An original song, "Boom" by X Ambassadors, appears on the soundtrack, the single was released on January 24, 2020, by Atlantic Records. "Speed Me Up" by American musicians Wiz Khalifa, Lil Yachty, Ty Dolla Sign, and Sueco the Child received 15 million streams, along with 1.8 billion views for the "Speed Me Up" TikTok challenge. "Friends" by Hyper Potions, which previously appeared as the opening theme of Sonic Mania (2017), also appears, along with arrangements of tracks from Masato Nakamura's score for the original Sonic the Hedgehog (1991). Holkenborg attempted to capture the feel of Nakamura's soundtracks for the Sonic and Sonic the Hedgehog 2 (1992) games, using Yamaha digital FM synthesizers (such as the DX7) similar to the Sega Genesis/Mega Drive console's Yamaha YM2612 sound chip.

== Release ==
=== Theatrical ===
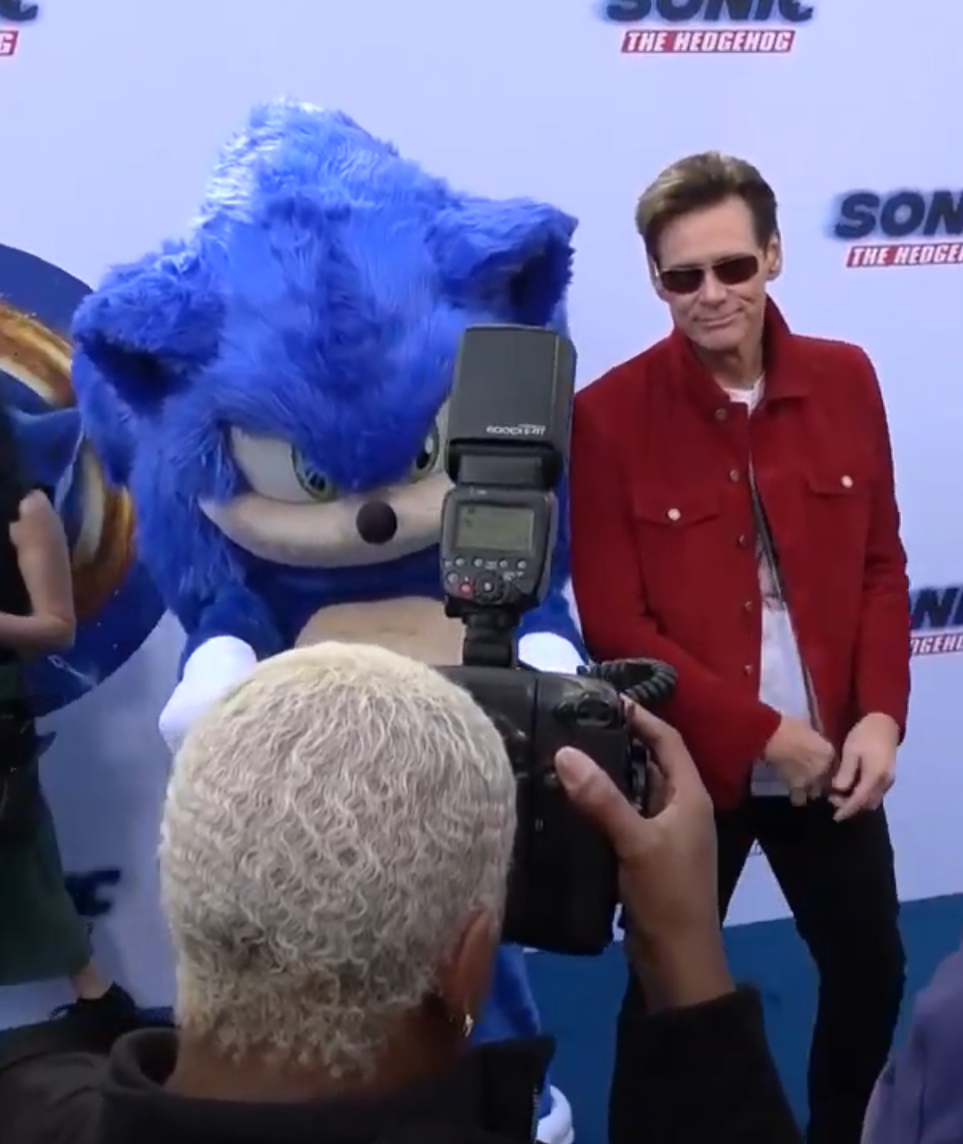
Jim Carrey at the premiere

Sonic the Hedgehog was scheduled for 2018 by Sony Pictures Releasing. In February 2018, shortly after taking over the rights, Paramount Pictures rescheduled the film to November 15, 2019. It was later moved up to a week earlier on November 8. Following the announcement of Sonic's redesign in May 2019, the film was delayed for the final time by three months, to February 14, 2020; this was to provide enough time for the redesign to be completed. Playing with Fire took the original release date. The world premiere took place at the Paramount Pictures studio lot in Los Angeles on January 25, 2020. The film was released theatrically in the United States in 4DX and Dolby Cinema formats. The film was originally going to be released in Japan on March 27, 2020, but had to be delayed to June 26, due to the COVID-19 pandemic.

=== Marketing ===
Test footage was screened at the Comic Con Experience in Brazil on December 9, 2018. It was followed by a teaser poster released on December 9, 2018, revealing the silhouette design of Sonic, with the tagline "A Whole New Speed of Hero". It received a negative response from critics and fans, and was compared unfavorably to another 2019 video game film adaptation, Detective Pikachu, which added fur and skin textures to the Pokémon characters. Sonic's humanoid appearance was described as evoking an uncanny valley response. Former members of Sonic Team, who created the Sonic the Hedgehog games, also expressed surprise. A second poster was leaked online shortly after. Fans complained of a lack of resemblance to the games and criticized the positioning of Sonic's legs, spawning an Internet meme in which users recreated the position. The film's official Twitter account posted an image of Sonic behind a sign reading: "Can't a guy work out?" Images of the Sonic design were leaked in March 2019 to more fan criticism. Sonic co-creator Yuji Naka was "shocked" by the design and felt the ratio of Sonic's head and abdomen was imbalanced.

The film was delayed to re-design Sonic after the original design (pictured) was heavily criticized.

The first trailer premiered on April 4, 2019, at CinemaCon in Las Vegas, and was released online on April 30. It received near-unanimous criticism, with Gita Jackson of Kotaku calling it "horrific" and "a blight upon this weary earth". Sonic's design was heavily criticized by fans for its humanoid appearance, while some found the use of Coolio's "Gangsta's Paradise" jarring. Conversely, CNET's Sean Keane praised the humor and references to the games. Within two days, the trailer was viewed more than 20 million times on YouTube, and had received hundreds of thousands of dislikes, drastically outnumbering its likes.

A second trailer revealing the redesigned Sonic was released on November 12, 2019. The trailer received far more positive responses, with many praising Sonic's new design. The tone and the humor also received positive reviews, as did the choice of song, J. J. Fad's "Supersonic" and Ramones' "Blitzkrieg Bop". Naka said he felt the new design was "much more Sonic-like". The second trailer received thousands of likes and the highest like-to-dislike ratio of any trailer on Google in the last three years. The trailers garnered a total of more than 500 million views worldwide. As a promotional tie-in, the version of Sonic seen in the film was added as a playable character to the mobile games Sonic Dash (2013) and Sonic Forces: Speed Battle (2017). Since Sonic the Hedgehog, other films and television series based on video game series have made it a production priority to assure characters and the details of the film are true to the works they are based on to appeal better to viewers that are fans of the games.

A modified version of the original design, named "Ugly Sonic", appeared as a supporting character in the 2022 film Chip 'n Dale: Rescue Rangers, playing off the Internet's reaction to the first trailer. According to Rescue Rangers director Akiva Schaffer, they had also used Moving Picture Company for their animation studio, and MPC was able to provide the original Sonic model for the film. The character was voiced in the film by comedian Tim Robinson.

=== Home media ===
On March 20, 2020, Paramount announced that Sonic the Hedgehog would be released to home media in the United States and Canada before the end of the usual 90-day theatrical run, as many film studios took the decision to release films earlier due to movie theaters closures in mid-March because of the COVID-19 pandemic restrictions. The digital version was released on March 31, 2020, and was released on DVD, Blu-ray, and Ultra HD Blu-ray by Paramount Home Entertainment on May 19, 2020. All home media releases include an original short film, Around the World in 80 Seconds.

The film topped the American Blu-ray and DVD charts for several weeks upon release. It was the sixth top-selling home video film of 2020 in the United States. The DVD and Blu-ray releases crossed 2 million units sold in the United States by January 2021 and earned about $50 million in US sales revenue as of 16 April 2022.

The film then made its move to streaming service Hulu on February 18, 2021, and on Amazon Prime Video the next day.

== Reception ==
=== Box office ===
Sonic the Hedgehog grossed $149 million in the United States and Canada, and $170.7 million in other territories, for a worldwide total of $320 million. It was the sixth-highest-grossing film of 2020, and the highest-grossing superhero film of the year, ending Marvel Studios' decade-long run of having the highest-grossing film of the genre (from 2010 to 2019). The film's budget was estimated at being between $85 million and $90 million.

In the United States and Canada, the film was released alongside Fantasy Island, The Photograph, and Downhill, and was initially projected to gross $40–50 million from 4,130 theaters in its four-day President's Day opening weekend. After making $21 million on its first day (including $3 million from Thursday night previews), estimates were raised to $64 million. It went on to top the box office with a $58 million debut over the three-day weekend, and $70 million over the four, breaking Detective Pikachu's record for the biggest opening weekend by a video game-based film. It was also the fourth-best President's Day holiday weekend and Jim Carrey's second biggest opening weekend, behind Bruce Almighty (2003). The success was attributed in part to the redesign of Sonic and the publicity it created, and the delayed release date, which meant it opened with less competition from other family films. Opening day audiences was 56% male, with 70% under 25 years. In its second weekend, Sonic the Hedgehog made $26.2 million and retained the top spot at the box office, bringing its ten-day domestic gross to $106.6 million. Sonic the Hedgehog made $16.3 million in its third weekend and was dethroned by newcomer The Invisible Man. On March 14, 2020, it became the highest-grossing film based on a video game in US box office history, surpassing Detective Pikachu.

Sonic the Hedgehog was released in 40 countries during its three-day opening weekend, topping the international box office with $43 million. Its strongest international regions were Latin America and Europe, with its largest openings being $6.7 million in Mexico, $6.2 million in the United Kingdom, $4.3 million in France, $3.3 million in Germany, and $3 million in Brazil. Worldwide, it made $101 million over the three-day weekend and $113 million over the four days. In its second weekend the film again topped the international box office with $38.3 million from 56 countries for a ten-day overseas gross of $96.5 million, and topped the global box office again with $64.6 million for a ten-day worldwide gross of $203.1 million. Its largest international markets in its first ten days were the United Kingdom ($19.1 million), Mexico ($12.3 million), and France ($9.1 million), retaining the top spot in these markets. The film opened in 16 new markets, led by a number-one debut in Russia ($6.3 million). The film was released in Japan on June 26, 2020, after being postponed from a previous March release due to the COVID-19 pandemic and debuted at No. 6 that weekend. In China, the release was also postponed due to the pandemic, eventually receiving a July 31 date and underperforming at the Chinese box office due to new pandemic-related theatre policies there.

In terms of box office admissions, the film sold 15,876,790 tickets in the United States and Canada (annual rank #3), 6,811,679 tickets in Mexico (annual #1), 893,634 tickets in Peru (annual #2), 468,697 tickets in Ecuador (annual #1), 67,230 tickets in the Dominican Republic (annual #2), 12,454,206 tickets in Europe (annual #3), 3,001,403 tickets in Brazil (annual #3), 698,500 tickets in China, 687,740 tickets in Argentina (annual #3), and 118,725 tickets in South Korea, for a combined 41,078,604 tickets sold in these territories.

=== Critical response ===
Sonic the Hedgehog received mixed reviews, with critics praising Sonic's redesign, humor and cast performances, but criticizing its product placements and unoriginal story. On Rotten Tomatoes, 64% of 252 reviews are positive, with an average rating of 5.9/10. The website's critics consensus reads: "Fittingly fleet and frequently fun, Sonic the Hedgehog is a video game-inspired adventure the whole family can enjoy -- and a fine excuse for Jim Carrey to tap into the manic energy that launched his career." On Metacritic, the film has a weighted average score of 47 out of 100, based on 42 critics, indicating "mixed or average reviews". Audiences polled by CinemaScore gave the film an average grade of "A" on an A+ to F scale, and PostTrak reported it received an average 4 out of 5 stars, with 66% of viewers they surveyed saying they would definitely recommend it.

Akeem Lawanson of IGN gave the film a score of 7 out of 10, praising the performances and the nostalgia, stating, "While this family-friendly action-comedy suffers from a simplistic story and leans too heavily on tired visual clichés, Sonic the Hedgehog is nevertheless boosted by solid performances from Ben Schwartz as Sonic and Jim Carrey as Dr. Robotnik. Their ongoing cat-and-mouse game is entertaining, and passionate fans of the Sega franchise should appreciate all the nods to Sonic's history." Dami Lee of The Verge gave the film a positive review, praising the nostalgic elements seen in the film, writing that it "shines when it remembers it's based on a video game, and there's some genuinely fun stuff—like when Sonic uses his time-stopping powers or Robotnik's elaborate 'evil-plotting' montage that makes you wonder why more movies don't feature bad guys with choreographed dance sequences. Carrey plays up Robotnik as the cartoon villain he is, and it's a true delight to watch him in his element." Corey Plante of Inverse called it a "road trip superhero movie" and "the best superhero movie of 2020" so far. John DeFore of The Hollywood Reporter, gave the film a positive review, saying: "Flesh-and-blood actors help keep this game derived kids' flick afloat."

Gene Park of The Washington Post gave the film a positive review, saying it was "the furthest thing from Cats, despite the early comparisons. Wary fans expecting the usual easy target to mock will instead find something to fervently celebrate for years." Amon Warrman of Empire gave the film two out of five stars, writing, "An on-form Jim Carrey can't stop Sonic's live-action debut from feeling like a missed opportunity. If the teased sequels do materialize, here's hoping the storytelling levels up." Ben Kenigsberg of The New York Times gave the film a negative review and wrote, "Sonic now resembles a cartoon hedgehog instead of a spray-painted marmot. But if anything was done to de-genericize the script, it hasn't helped. Not that the Sega games—in which the fleet-footed hero zips around doing flips and collecting gold coins (which here encircle the Paramount Mountain) gave the director, Jeff Fowler, much to work with."

Variety's Owen Gleiberman criticized the tone: "For all the borderline tedium I felt at Sonic the Hedgehog, I do realize that this is a picture made for 8-year-olds. And they'll probably like it just fine. Yet I would also call the overly kiddified tone of the movie a mistake." Writing for The Guardian, Steve Rose gave the film two out of five, saying elements were "clearly indebted" to other films, such as Quicksilver's powers in the X-Men movies, and finding the message of friendship "trite and familiar". Simon Abrams of RogerEbert.com gave the film one out of four, writing, "Sonic the Hedgehog is only as successful as the amount of time you want to spend watching its animated protagonist go on instantly forgettable adventures, and boy, is that unfortunate." Tim Grierson of Screen Daily also gave the film a negative review, writing, "The film projects enough benign cheerfulness that the experience is never unpleasant, but one can't help but feel the filmmakers' strain in crafting a sly action-comedy for audiences expecting over-the-top spectacle and nonstop quips. Sadly, Sonic isn't swift enough to deliver."

=== Accolades ===
Year	Award	Category	Recipients	Result	Ref.
2020	SXSW Film Festival	Excellence in Title Design	Sonic the Hedgehog	Nominated	
2020	People's Choice Awards	The Family Movie of 2020	Sonic the Hedgehog	Nominated	
2021	Critics' Choice Super Awards	Best Superhero Movie	Sonic the Hedgehog	Nominated	
2021	Critics' Choice Super Awards	Best Villain in a Movie	Jim Carrey	Won	
2021	Critics' Choice Super Awards	Best Actor in a Superhero Movie	Ben Schwartz and Jim Carrey	Nominated	
2021	Hollywood Critics Association Awards	Best Animated or VFX Performance	Ben Schwartz	Won	
2021	Hollywood Critics Association Awards	Best Blockbuster	Sonic the Hedgehog	Nominated	
2021	Hollywood Critics Association Awards	Best Visual Effects	Ged Wright	Nominated	
2021	Nickelodeon Kids' Choice Awards	Favorite Movie	Sonic the Hedgehog	Nominated	
2021	Nickelodeon Kids' Choice Awards	Favorite Movie Actor	Jim Carrey	Nominated	
2021	Ursa Major Awards	Best Motion Picture	Sonic the Hedgehog	Nominated	
2021	Saturn Awards	Best Fantasy Film Release	Sonic the Hedgehog	Nominated	

== Franchise ==
=== Novelization ===
A novel based on the film, Sonic the Hedgehog: The Official Movie Novelization, written by Kiel Phegley and published by Penguin Books, was released alongside the film on February 14, 2020.

=== Sequels ===
Sonic the Hedgehog 2 was released in 2022, followed by Sonic the Hedgehog 3 in 2024. In December 2024, a fourth film was announced and is set to release in theatres on March 19, 2027.

=== Television series ===
In April 2024, a spin-off miniseries, Knuckles, starring Idris Elba as Knuckles the Echidna, was released on Paramount+.

== See also ==
- List of films based on video games
