= Terminator: Dark Fate =

2019 American film by Tim Miller

- Theatrical release poster
- Directed by: Tim Miller
- Screenplay by: David Goyer; Justin Rhodes; Billy Ray
- Story by: James Cameron; Charles H. Eglee; Josh Friedman; David Goyer; Justin Rhodes
- Produced by: James Cameron; David Ellison
- Starring: Arnold Schwarzenegger; Linda Hamilton; Mackenzie Davis; Natalia Reyes; Gabriel Luna
- Cinematography: Ken Seng
- Edited by: Julian Clarke
- Music by: Tom Holkenborg
- Production companies: Skydance Media; Lightstorm Entertainment; Tencent Pictures
- Distributed by: Paramount Pictures (United States and Canada); 20th Century Fox (International; through Buena Vista International)
- Release dates: October 23, 2019 (Europe); November 1, 2019 (United States)
- Running time: 128 minutes
- Countries: China; United States
- Language: English
- Budget: $185–196 million
- Box office: $261.1 million

Terminator: Dark Fate is a 2019 science fiction action film directed by Tim Miller. It is the sixth installment in the Terminator franchise and a sequel to The Terminator (1984) and Terminator 2: Judgment Day (1991), ignoring the events of Terminator 3: Rise of the Machines (2003), Terminator Salvation (2009) and Terminator Genisys (2015). The film was written by David S. Goyer, Justin Rhodes, and Billy Ray. The film stars Linda Hamilton and Arnold Schwarzenegger reprising their roles as Sarah Connor and the Terminator respectively and also features Mackenzie Davis, Natalia Reyes and Gabriel Luna.

The film is set 25 years after the events of Terminator 2, when a malevolent artificial intelligence known as Legion from an alternate future sends a highly advanced Terminator, the Rev-9, back in time to 2020 with instructions to kill Dani Ramos, whose fate is to become the leader of the Human Resistance in the future. The Resistance also sends Grace, an augmented soldier, back in time to defend Dani, who is also joined by Sarah Connor and Skynet's T-800 Terminator. Principal photography took place from June to November 2018 in Hungary, Spain, and the United States.

Terminator: Dark Fate was released theatrically in the United States on November 1, 2019, by Paramount Pictures in the United States and Canada and by 20th Century Fox (through Buena Vista International) in other countries. The film received mixed reviews from critics and grossed $261 million on a budget of $185–196 million, becoming a box-office failure.

== Plot ==
In 1998, three years after the destruction of Cyberdyne Systems, (Note: As depicted in Terminator 2: Judgment Day (1991)) Sarah and John Connor have retreated to Livingston, Guatemala, where they are ambushed by a T-800 Terminator—one of several sent back through time by Skynet prior to its erasure—which kills John despite Sarah's efforts to protect him.

In 2020, an advanced Terminator known as the Rev-9 is sent from the future to Mexico City to assassinate Dani Ramos. At the same time, a cybernetically enhanced soldier named Grace is sent from the year 2042 to protect her. The Rev-9, disguised as Dani's father, infiltrates the auto assembly plant where Dani and her brother Diego work but is intercepted by Grace, who escapes with the siblings. Using its ability to separate into a solid endoskeleton and a shape-shifting liquid exterior, the Rev-9 pursues them, killing Diego and cornering Grace and Dani. They are rescued by Sarah Connor, who temporarily disables both components of the Rev-9.

Grace and Dani steal Sarah's vehicle to flee but are forced to stop when Grace suffers a metabolic crash due to her augmentations. After acquiring medicine from a pharmacy, they are confronted by Sarah, who leads them to a motel. There, Sarah explains that since John's death she has received encrypted messages pinpointing the arrivals of Terminators—each signed "For John"—allowing her to intercept and destroy them. Grace reveals that in her timeline, Skynet and John never existed. Instead, an AI called Legion, developed for cyberwarfare, triggered a nuclear apocalypse after being deemed a threat to humanity. Legion created a machine army to exterminate the survivors, who formed a resistance. In this future, Dani is a central figure in humanity's struggle against Legion.

Tracing the source of Sarah's messages to Laredo, Texas, the group evades both the Rev-9 and U.S. authorities while crossing the border. There, they encounter the same T-800 that killed John. Having completed its mission and with no Skynet to give it further instructions, the Terminator—now self-aware and calling itself "Carl"—integrated into human society, forming a family and developing a conscience. Seeking redemption, Carl began sending Sarah the coordinates of time displacement events to give her purpose. He agrees to help them defeat the Rev-9, and Sarah reluctantly joins forces with him for Dani's sake. Anticipating the Rev-9's pursuit, Carl urges his adopted family to flee.

The group obtains a electromagnetic pulse (EMP) device with the help of Sarah's contact, Major Dean. However, the Rev-9 arrives and destroys the EMPs during a shootout, forcing the group to escape by air. During the flight, Grace reveals that Dani is the future leader of the resistance. The Rev-9 boards their aircraft and subdues Carl, forcing Grace, Sarah, and Dani to parachute out near a hydroelectric dam. The two Terminators follow them.

At the dam, the group makes a final stand. Carl and Grace manage to drag the Rev-9 into a turbine, causing a massive explosion that disables all three. The Rev-9's damaged endoskeleton incapacitates Sarah, leaving Dani to face it alone. A mortally wounded Grace urges Dani to use her power core as a weapon. Though initially overpowered, Dani is aided by Carl, who reactivates and restrains the Rev-9 long enough for Dani to destroy it with Grace's power source. Carl and the Rev-9 are destroyed in the ensuing blast.

In the aftermath, Dani and Sarah watch a young Grace playing at a park with her family. Determined to change the future once more, they drive off to prepare for the coming war.

== Cast ==
- Linda Hamilton as Sarah Connor, the mother of John Connor, the former future leader of the Human Resistance in the war against Skynet. Now a battle-hardened senior woman and left alone after John's death, Sarah hunts and kills Skynet's remaining Terminators to prevent Judgment Day and forestall the coming conflict. In the film, she serves as a narrative bridge between divergent timelines, navigating a past dominated by Skynet and a future threatened by the rogue AI Legion. After learning Dani Ramos's destiny as the leader of a new human resistance against Legion, Sarah embraces her renewed purpose. She begins training Dani as she once trained her son, John.
  - Maddy Curley serves as a stunt actress and body double for a young Sarah Connor, with CGI applied to recreate Hamilton's facial likeness from the 1990s opening scene.
  - Jessi Fisher serves as a stunt actress and body double for present- day Sarah Connor.
- Arnold Schwarzenegger as the T-800 / Carl: An aging Terminator built by Skynet and one of several sent back in time to kill John. After completing its mission, it gained autonomy and integrated into human society, becoming benign and later starting an emotional relationship with a woman while raising her son. It lives in Laredo, Texas and owns a drapery business. Similarly to Sarah, Carl experiences a form of remorse over John Connor's assassination and serves as an additional narrative bridge between the Skynet and Legion timelines. It later joins forces with Sarah and Grace to help protect Dani from the Rev-9, although Sarah continues to hate Carl for John's death. Dark Fate marks the first film in the series where Schwarzenegger appears as the titular character, but does not receive top billing.
  - Brett Azar serves as a body double for the young T-800, with CGI applied to recreate Schwarzenegger's facial likeness from the 1990s opening scene. Azar reprises this role from Terminator Genisys.
- Mackenzie Davis as Grace, an enhanced super soldier from 2042 who was previously taken in by Dani as a teenager. Grace was subsequently trained and raised by Dani. Grace is later part of a security detail for Dani and she sustains stab wounds while fighting off a Rev-7 Terminator. Following the attack, she volunteers to be converted into a cyborg. Augmented with robotics, she has abilities comparable to those of a Terminator for short periods of time and requires medication, nourishment and rest to replenish her strength. Her enhanced senses and abilities allow her to detect machines such as Legion's before normal humans. Grace is sent to protect Dani's younger self from Legion's Rev-9.
  - Stephanie Gil portrays a 10-year-old Grace.
- Natalia Reyes as Dani Ramos, a young woman who works with her brother at an automobile assembly plant in Mexico City. Dani is being targeted for termination by the Rev-9. At first, Sarah believes that Dani is the Resistance leader's destined mother (like Sarah). However, it is revealed that Dani is fated to take on a role akin to that of Sarah's deceased son, as the Resistance's founding commander in the war against the machines of Legion, with Sarah as her mentor. In the future, Dani sends Grace back in time to stop the Rev-9 and she instructs Grace to seek the T-800 for aid by tattooing its location coordinates on her.
- Gabriel Luna as Gabriel / Rev-9, an advanced Terminator that originated from Legion and was sent back in time to terminate Dani. Featuring a traditional solid endoskeleton covered with liquid metal, the Rev-9 possesses the ability to separate these two components into two separate, fully autonomous units.
- Diego Boneta as Diego Ramos, Dani's brother.
- Tristán Ulloa as Felipe Gandal, Dani's uncle and a border coyote.
- Alicia Borrachero as Alicia, Carl's wife.
- Manuel Pacific as Mateo, Carl's step-son.
- Enrique Arce as Vicente, Dani's and Diego's father.
- Fraser James as Major Dean, a United States Air Force intelligence officer and Sarah's acquaintance.
- Tom Hopper as William Hardell, Grace's commanding officer in the Resistance.
- Stuart McQuarrie as Craig, Dani and Diego's work supervisor.
- Steven Cree as Rigby, a United States Border Patrol agent
- Georgia Simon, the film's ADR voice casting director, provided the voice of Grace's mother.
- Edward Furlong as "John Connor reference", a young version of John Connor created using CGI and motion capture.
  - Aaron Kunitz provided the voice of young John Connor.
  - Jude Collie served as a body double for young John Connor, onto which Furlong's facial likeness from the 1990s was applied.
- Earl Boen appears as Dr. Silberman via uncredited archival footage from Terminator 2: Judgment Day.

== Production ==
=== Development ===
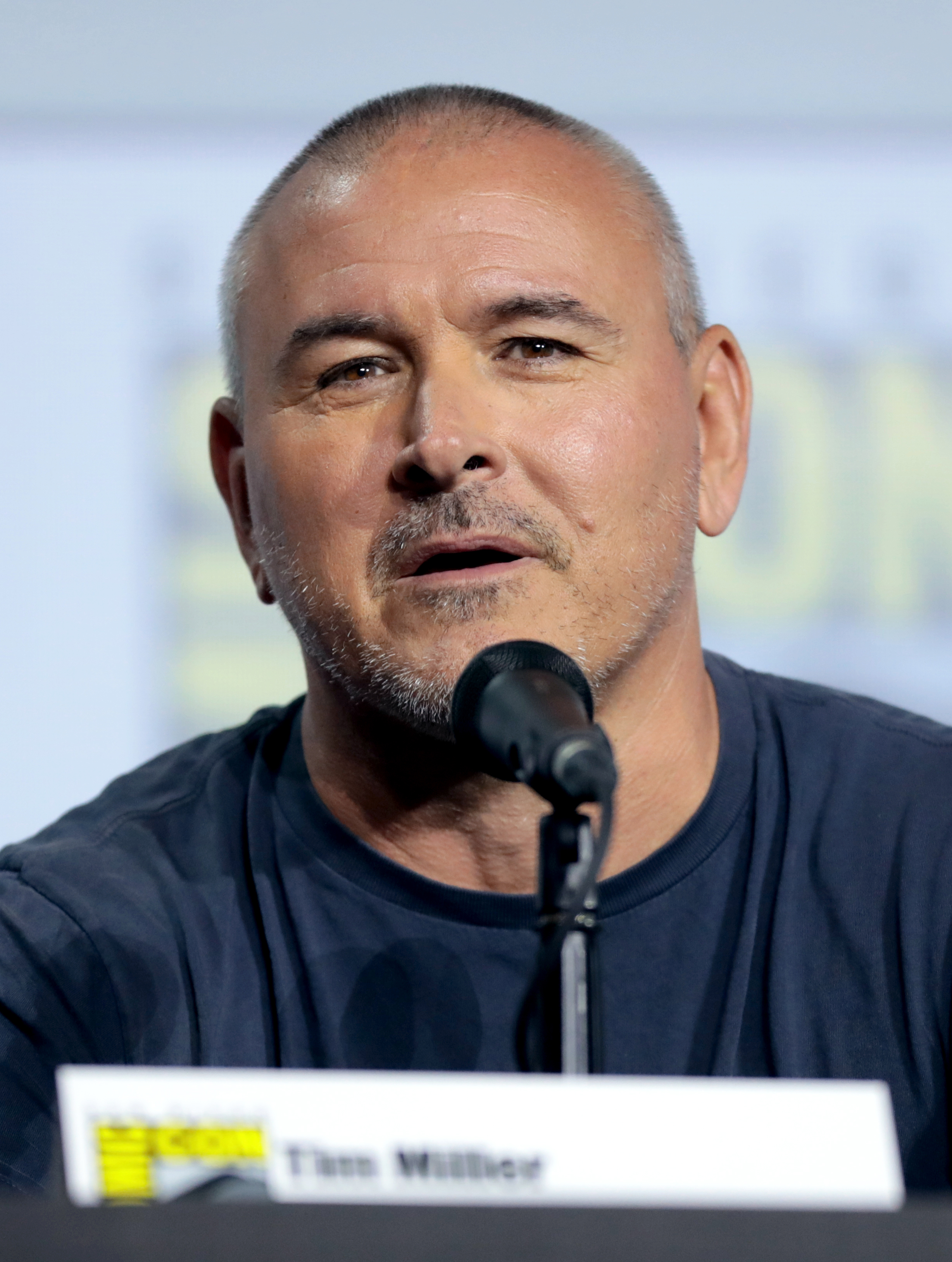
Tim Miller, director of Terminator: Dark Fate, promoting the film at the 2019 San Diego Comic-Con

By December 2013, Skydance Productions was planning for Terminator Genisys to be the start of a new trilogy of films. The Genisys sequels were scheduled for release on May 19, 2017, and June 29, 2018. For the second film in the planned trilogy, actor Arnold Schwarzenegger was to reprise his role as the T-800. Terminator Genisys was produced by Skydance founder David Ellison and was released in 2015, but its disappointing box-office performance stalled the development of the planned trilogy. Dana Goldberg, the chief creative officer for Skydance, said in October 2015 that she "wouldn't say [the franchise is] on hold, so much as re-adjusting". According to Goldberg, despite Genisys' disappointing domestic performance, the company was happy with its worldwide numbers and still intended to make new films. Production of a sequel would begin no earlier than 2016 because the company planned market research to determine its direction after Genisys. The Genisys sequels were ultimately canceled.

Tim Miller and Ellison talked about Miller eventually directing a new Terminator film after completing Deadpool 2 (2018). When Miller left the Deadpool 2 project in October 2016, he took on the Terminator film as his next project instead. At the request of Miller, franchise creator James Cameron subsequently joined the project. Cameron had directed and co-written the first two Terminator films, and Miller, through his company Blur Studio, had previously worked with Cameron. Ellison felt that Genisys could have been better, so he recruited Cameron as a fellow producer in hopes of creating a better film. Cameron was intrigued by Ellison's proposal to make a sequel to Terminator 2: Judgment Day (1991), ignoring the events of Terminator 3: Rise of the Machines (2003), Terminator Salvation (2009), and Terminator Genisys. Cameron said "we're pretending the other films were a bad dream. Or an alternate timeline, which is permissible in our multi-verse." Other filmmakers on the project had suggested making the film without Schwarzenegger, but Cameron disliked the idea as he and Schwarzenegger were friends. Cameron agreed to produce the film on the condition that Schwarzenegger be involved. As producer, Cameron was involved in pre-production and script work, and also provided his input on the project. Miller felt that audiences had "lost hope" in the franchise following the last three films. He believed that Cameron's involvement would serve as a "seal of quality" which would convince fans that the franchise "was going to be handled at least in a way that the original filmmaker would want".

Cameron was involved with the film as of January 2017 and Ellison was searching for a writer among science fiction authors with the intention that Miller direct. Later in the month, Ellison said there would be an announcement regarding the future of the franchise before the end of the year, adding that it was going to be in a direction that would provide "the continuation of what the fans really wanted since T2". In July 2017, Cameron said that he was working with Ellison to set up a trilogy of films and supervise them. The intention was for Schwarzenegger to be involved, but also to introduce new characters and "pass the baton".

=== Pre-production ===
On September 12, 2017, Skydance Media confirmed that Tim Miller would direct the new Terminator film which was initially scheduled for a theatrical release on July 26, 2019. The film's budget was approximately $185–$196 million, split roughly three ways between Skydance, Paramount Pictures and 20th Century Fox. Chinese company Tencent Pictures joined the project as a co-financier in April 2018, ultimately financing ten percent of the budget. Tencent also handled the film's distribution, marketing and merchandising in China. TSG Entertainment and Cameron's Lightstorm Entertainment were also involved in the film's production.

=== Writing ===
Before screenwriters were hired, Miller had asked that a group of novelists be consulted on how to reinvent the franchise. Among the novelists were Joe Abercrombie, Neal Asher, Greg Bear, Warren Ellis and Neal Stephenson. Abercrombie suggested the idea of a female character who is half human and half machine, forming the origins of the character Grace. A human-machine character, Marcus Wright, was previously featured in Terminator Salvation, portrayed by Sam Worthington.

The film's story was conceived by Miller, Cameron and Ellison and a team of writers was hired to write the script. They included Charles H. Eglee, David S. Goyer and his writing partner Justin Rhodes and Josh Friedman, creator of the television series Terminator: The Sarah Connor Chronicles. Cameron and the writers watched the Terminator sequels that came after his initial films. They determined that the storylines of the later films were too complex when it came to time travel. Weeks were spent working on the story which was eventually envisioned as a new Terminator film trilogy. Goyer wrote a draft for the first film in the trilogy that would ultimately become Terminator: Dark Fate.

Goyer moved on to other projects. By November 2017, Billy Ray was brought in to polish the script. Ray rewrote much of Goyer's draft. Miller wrote the film's action scenes, while Ray handled the characters. Cameron had a list of action scenes, for no particular film, that he had wanted to shoot over the years. He gave this list to Miller, so he could work them into Terminator: Dark Fate. The list formed the basis for scenes involving a dam and a Humvee underwater. As the start of filming approached, Cameron felt that the script needed improvement and made the changes himself. The film's story credits were given to James Cameron, Charles Eglee, Josh Friedman, David Goyer and Justin Rhodes; screenplay by David Goyer, Justin Rhodes and Billy Ray. Cameron said that he and Miller ultimately had many disagreements about the film, but he described it as being part of the creative process. Among their disagreements was whether the human resistance would be winning or losing to Legion in the future. Miller wanted the humans to be losing, while Cameron felt differently. Miller said, "Legion is so powerful, the only way to beat it is going back in time and strangle it in the crib. Jim says, 'What's dramatic about the humans losing?' And I say, 'Well, What's dramatic about the humans winning and they just need to keep on winning?' I like a last stand. It's not his thing." Miller also had disagreements with Ellison.

Miller said that the destruction of Cyberdyne at the end of Terminator 2: Judgment Day is an event which would change the future "but no one knew how. And I don't think the movies that came after it really explored that in a clean way like I believe we are, with true consequences, and it makes perfect sense for Sarah to be the one to face those consequences since they were her choices to begin with." One consequence would be the death of John Connor, who was initially meant to become the future leader of the human resistance against machines. The decision to kill the John Connor character came from Cameron, who wanted to surprise audiences who had become invested in the character's mythology: "It's like, 'Let's just get that right off the table. Let's just pull the carpet out from underneath all of our assumptions of what a Terminator movie is going to be about. Let's just put a bullet in his head at a pizzeria in the first 45 seconds.'" Cameron said that John's death serves as "a springboard for the story to show Sarah's ultimate trauma from which she only begins to recover right at the end of the new film. She's driven by hatred, by revenge. (...) Her badassery comes from a place of deep hurt and deep pain."

Miller said that he and the other filmmakers did not find the decision to kill John controversial. Miller felt that Sarah Connor was best portrayed as an unhappy character and he said that John's death provided a reason for her to be that way. Miller said of Sarah Connor: "Grief has made her want to be an emotionless killing machine. And at the end of the movie, she's allowing herself to care again, she comes back to humanity. Her shriveled heart has blossomed again. That was the journey". However, Miller did not want Sarah Connor to be an unpleasant and "unwatchable" character and said, "I think Sarah is tough, but it's not uncomfortable to watch."

Cameron believed that removing John Connor would prevent the film from feeling like a retread of previous films. Discarding John Connor allowed for new characters to be worked into the story. Miller said, "You can't have John be a 36-year-old accountant somewhere. And really, when you think about it, he could be sort of a pathetic figure as a man who had missed his moment in history and was relegated to this banal, ordinary existence". Describing the opening scene, Miller said, "You want to slap the audience in the face and say, 'Wake up. This is going to be different.' I feel like that accomplished that. I hate the violence of it. I hate the idea of a kid being shot, but the dramatic fuel that it gives the story is kind of undeniable." In the early stages of development, there was consideration given to the idea that Dani Ramos could be portrayed as John's daughter, or that she could have some other connection to the Connors. However, Miller disliked the idea that she would be related to them. There were never plans to feature John Connor in any other scenes besides the opening. Linda Hamilton was somewhat shocked by the decision to kill John Connor, which she believed would upset a lot of fans, but she also said she wanted the film series and its characters to evolve. She was pleased with the film's characters, feeling that earlier sequels to Terminator 2 lacked characters the audience would care about.

Miller was dissatisfied with the final film's idea that Dani would send Grace to the past, saying, "We set up this whole [story] where Grace is kind of Dani's surrogate child and a mother sending her child to die for her is just...yeah, I had a different scene in mind." Additionally, several endings were considered, including one where Sarah and Dani would bury Grace and another where Grace's body would be burned and sent down a river. Eventually, Miller suggested the idea that Dani would go to see the younger Grace. The ending playground scene was a late addition to the film.

Cameron devised the idea of a T-800 Terminator that is "just out there in this kind of limbo" for more than 20 years after carrying out an order, becoming more human "in the sense that he's evaluating the moral consequences of things that he did, that he was ordered to do back in his early days, and really kind of developing a consciousness and a conscience". Cameron considered this iteration of the character to be more interesting than those featured in his first two films, saying, "We've seen the Terminator that was programmed to be bad; you've seen the one that was programmed to be good, to be a protector. But in both cases, neither one of them have free will." Schwarzenegger enjoys interior decorating, so Cameron suggested that his T-800 character in the film have a drapery business. Miller arranged the script's structure to have Schwarzenegger's character appear later in the story, to allow time for the three female lead characters to develop.

=== Casting ===
By April 2017, Schwarzenegger had joined the project to reprise his role. That September, it was announced Hamilton would reprise her role as Sarah Connor, whom she previously portrayed in the first two films. Hamilton had also briefly reprised the role for the 1996 theme park attraction T2-3D: Battle Across Time, and provided her voice in an uncredited role for Terminator Salvation. Because previous Terminator films did not do well with audiences, Miller felt it was necessary to have Hamilton reprise the role. Cameron, Ellison and Miller only wanted to bring back the Sarah Connor character if Hamilton would reprise the role. The film's storyline was devised first so the trio would have an idea to pitch to Hamilton. Cameron said that he sent Hamilton a "long rambling email with a lot of reasons why she should do it and a lot of reasons why she shouldn't". Cameron's main reason why Hamilton should return was that people liked her in the role. There was never a version of the film that excluded Hamilton and Miller said there was no backup plan in the event that she declined the role.

After approximately six weeks, Hamilton chose to sign on to the film, which did not yet have a completed script for her to read; that was still being refined. Initially, Hamilton was unsure if she wanted to reprise the role. She had been semi-retired from acting, and said, "I didn't want it to look like a shameless money grab. I am living this quiet, lovely life that doesn't involve being a celebrity, and you really have to think, do I really want to trade that in again for another 15 minutes?" Because so much time had passed since her last appearance as Sarah Connor, Hamilton had assumed that she would never reprise the role and she was surprised by the offer to do so. Of her decision to return Hamilton said, "I was very pleased that all of the years had passed, because I could fill the years up with so much backstory and inner life that could power the character."

Hamilton spent more than a year working with a fitness trainer to get into physical shape for the role. Hamilton said she put 10 times more effort into her physique than she did for Terminator 2. This included a regimen of supplements and bioidentical hormones, as well as training with Green Berets. She also took weapons training. Commenting on Hamilton's role, Cameron said he liked the idea of an action film starring a 62-year-old actress. Hamilton chose to dye her hair gray for the film, as she wanted viewers to see her character as an old woman. Hamilton disliked the physical training, and she had suggested that her character be portrayed as a fat person so she would not have to train for the film, although the idea was rejected.

In March 2018, it was announced that Mackenzie Davis had been cast in the film. Miller said of Davis, "I didn't just want a woman who could physically fit the role but emotionally as well. Mackenzie really wanted to do it; she came after the role. She worked harder than anybody." After Davis was cast, she undertook physical training for the film's fight scenes. Schwarzenegger and Gabriel Luna also underwent physical training for the film. Luna was first considered for a role in December 2017, when a four-month casting process began for him.

The production team wanted to cast an 18-to-20-year-old woman as the new centerpiece of the story. Hamilton rehearsed lines with several actresses who were auditioning for the role of Dani and she immediately felt that Natalia Reyes was the right choice. When Reyes sent in an audition tape, all she knew about the project was that it was a "big American movie". She soon had a meeting with Miller through Skype, before coming to Los Angeles to audition with Hamilton. For her next audition, Reyes was flown to Dublin to audition with Davis, who was there shooting another film. The casting process lasted a month and a half for Reyes before she was finally cast. Afterwards, she went through physical training to prepare for the role.

Because the film is partially set in Mexico City, the cast includes several Latino actors, including Reyes, Luna and Diego Boneta, who were cast as primary characters in April 2018. Reyes said, "This movie is a reflection of Hollywood now. We are just changing these stereotypes and the ideas and the cliches of what a Latino should be." Cameron watched all the audition tapes and gave his approval to the casting choices. By June 2018, Jude Collie had been cast as the double for a young John Connor, with Brett Azar reprising his role from Genisys as the body double for a younger T-800.

Cameron announced in July 2019 that Edward Furlong would reprise his role as John Connor from Terminator 2: Judgment Day. Furlong later maintained that his role in the film was small, and Miller regretted that Cameron had made such an announcement. Furlong's likeness was used to recreate his younger face digitally using CGI. He also gave a performance through facial motion capture footage to de-age him that was added into the film. For his performance, Furlong simultaneously watched footage of Collie during the film's opening scene and had to match his own performance with Collie's precisely. Furlong is credited as "John Connor reference". Furlong was disappointed by his small role, which was limited to one day of work.

=== Filming ===
Production was intended to start initially in March 2018, but was delayed due to casting. It was then expected to start during May and end during November with filming taking place in Hungary, the United Kingdom, Spain and Mexico. In April 2018, the film's release date was delayed until November 2019. Filming began in Spain on June 4, 2018, under the working title Terminator 6: Phoenix. Filming subsequently moved to Hungary and the United States, before concluding in November 2018.

The film, like Cameron's initial Terminator films, is rated R, whereas the previous two films were rated PG-13. Miller said the film is rated R because "the fans kind of demanded it, in a way", saying that "the DNA of Terminator" is an R-rated movie and that "to not do it R feels disingenuous to the source material". Initially, certain scenes were filmed in two ways—with and without R-rated violence and language. This gave the filmmakers an alternative in the event that the film's intended R rating should be reconsidered. The filmmakers eventually abandoned this method after deciding definitively on an R-rated film.

During filming, Cameron made further changes to the script to perfect the characters. In some cases, his script changes were submitted to Miller only a day prior to filming the scene. Hamilton rejected certain actions and lines of dialogue that she felt were uncharacteristic for Sarah Connor. Schwarzenegger also added and changed some of his own lines during filming. Cameron did not visit the set, as he was busy filming his Avatar sequels. He also did not want to interfere with Miller's directorial work.

==== Spain ====
The first day of filming took place in Isleta del Moro, Almería, Spain. It involved the pivotal opening scene featuring the characters of the T-800, Sarah Connor and John Connor. The three characters were portrayed in the scene by body doubles and digital de-aging was later applied to give them a youthful appearance. The doubles wore special hoods that tracked their head movements, allowing their facial features to be replaced later by new motion capture facial footage recorded by Schwarzenegger, Hamilton and Furlong.

During filming of the opening scene, Hamilton expressed dissatisfaction with the body double's portrayal, feeling that it did not accurately reflect the character. Hamilton advised the body double on how to portray the character for a more fierce response to the T-800 character. Hamilton was disappointed that she had no onscreen part in the scene and later said, "It wasn't me and it really hurt. I cried my eyes out when I got home." The film used more stuntwomen for Sarah Connor than Terminator 2. Hamilton said she "really got a little crazy trying to micromanage" them to ensure that they moved the way her character should. For this reason, Hamilton performed some of her own stunts.

Scenes that were set in Mexico were shot entirely in Spain, where filming lasted approximately 30 days. Spain was chosen for budgetary reasons and because of safety concerns over drug cartel violence in Mexico. Filming locations included the Madrid neighborhoods of Pueblo Nuevo and Lavapiés, which stood in as Mexican towns. For these scenes, the film crew repainted cars to resemble taxis and also left old vehicles on the streets to suggest they were abandoned. An artist was also hired to paint graffiti art to further give the location a Mexican appearance. Boneta, who was born and raised in Mexico City, was asked to meet with the film's art department leaders to ensure that the filming locations in Spain had an authentic Mexican look. While filming in Spain, Luna coached several actors on how to speak Spanish with a Mexican accent.

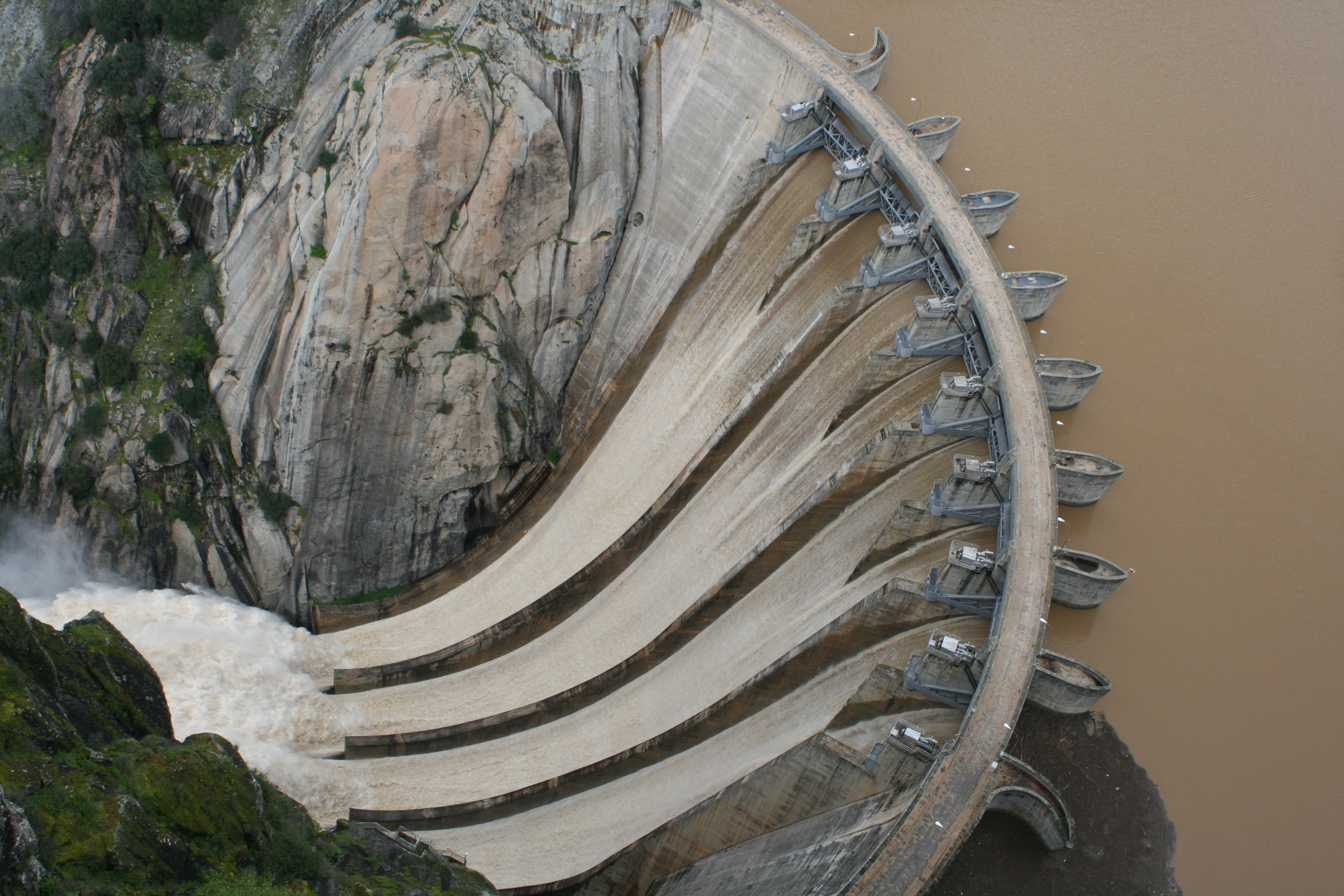
Aldeadávila Dam

In July 2018, filming took place for two weeks in Catral, including the San Juan industrial estate. Filming also took place in Cartagena, and at the Aldeadávila Dam. A combination of practical effects and CGI were used for a highway chase sequence in which the Rev-9 pursues Grace, Dani and Diego. Sarah Connor's present-day introduction also takes place on the highway and Hamilton rehearsed the scene extensively before it was filmed. Approximately seven freeway locations in Spain had been considered before settling on the final choice, consisting of new roads leading to the then-unopened Región de Murcia International Airport.

The highway chase sequence required a crew of approximately 300 people, with many different film departments involved. A custom-built pod car, similar to a dune buggy, was built to haul a pickup truck during filming. This allowed Davis, Reyes and Boneta to act out their scenes in the truck while the driving was handled by a professional driver in the pod car. Cameras were attached to the pickup truck to film the actors while the vehicle was in motion. One shot filmed at the San Juan industrial estate depicts the Rev-9 driving its plow truck through a wall, which was built specifically for the shot. The highway chase was initially planned to be twice as long. The Rev-9 was to have killed a cop and stolen a motorcycle to continue its pursuit and the motorcycle would be shot at and destroyed. The Rev-9 would subsequently leap onto a truck and then onto Dani's vehicle. The extended sequence was previsualized, but Miller chose not to film it as the sequence was considered "crazy" enough already. Previously, Miller had wanted to film the motorcycle sequence for his 2016 film Deadpool.

==== Hungary and U.S. ====
Filming moved to Hungary on July 19, 2018. Filming locations there included Origo Film Studios in Budapest. Part of the film's C-5 plane sequence involves the characters floating in the fuselage in zero gravity. Miller spoke with pilots to do research into gravity and the plane's action scenes, which were difficult to choreograph because of the constant gravity changes depicted. Hamilton said the film's script was the first one that she did not fully understand, because of the large amount of action. Animated previsualization aided the cast during such scenes. In Budapest, special effects supervisor Neil Corbould created the film's largest set piece: the fuselage of the C-5. The set was constructed on an 85-ton gimbal, the largest ever built. The set was capable of rotating 360 degrees and could tilt backwards and forwards at 10 degrees. It was powered by five 200-liter-per-minute hydraulic pumps, as well as more than a mile and a half of hydraulic hoses. A pit had to be dug in the concrete floor of the sound stage to accommodate the large set, which took approximately five months to design and another five months to build. The set was 60 feet long, half the length of a real C-5 fuselage and it contained a bluescreen at one end for post-production effects to be added in later. The rotating set helped to achieve the sense of gravity needed for the scene and the set also allowed the camera crew members to strap themselves inside. The plane set was padded for actors who shot scenes inside it. Foam replicas of military vehicles were also situated inside the plane with the actors.

Davis said shooting the film was "the hardest thing" she had ever done because of the physical requirements. One scene depicts a Humvee falling out of the C-5 plane, with Grace having to open the vehicle's parachutes to land it safely. Davis was suspended with wires to perform the scene, which was filmed in Budapest. An underwater action scene took weeks to shoot and involved immersing Hamilton and Reyes in a water tank. The scene depicts Sarah and Dani inside the Humvee after it falls over the dam and into water. The scene was shot in a tank surrounded by a large bluescreen stage which depicted the exterior environment. For the scene, each day of shooting took place over 12-hour periods from the evening to the morning. Another scene depicts the T-800 and Rev-9 fighting underwater.

The film includes a scene where the characters are held in a detention center on the Mexico–United States border. Miller said it was not meant as a social commentary or political statement on immigrant issues related to the border, stating that the scene was "just a natural evolution of the story". He noted: "I tried to walk a line there because it's a terrible situation, but I didn't want to vilify border guards. They're people doing a job. The system is the problem. And even the choice to do it really wasn't a statement. It really was a function of us putting the story's beginning in central Mexico and then traveling." Miller was emotional while filming the scene because of its depiction of immigrants being held in a detention center. Luna said, "We don't make any overt political stances; we just show you what's happening in the world and you receive it however as you may." Scenes at the detention center were filmed in July 2018, at an old Nokia factory in the Hungarian city of Komárom.

In late July 2018, Schwarzenegger began filming scenes in Budapest. In September 2018, filming took place at a Mercedes-Benz factory in Kecskemét. Filming in the United States was scheduled to begin in mid-October. Carl's cabin was built from scratch. While the filmmakers liked the surrounding scenery, they rejected a previous house that was built on the property for another production, so it was torn down to construct the new home. Schwarzenegger completed filming on October 28, 2018. Filming wrapped in early November 2018.

=== Post-production ===
Cameron, who also works as a film editor, was heavily involved in the editing of Terminator: Dark Fate. He saw a rough cut of the film in early 2019 and provided Miller with notes on how to improve it feeling it needed to be perfected. He said the film "transformed quite a bit" from the rough cut. The initial cut of the film, known as an assembly cut, was two hours and 50 minutes. Miller's director's cut was closer to the film's final runtime. Three or four minutes were removed from the director's cut, including a few scenes. Some scenes were also trimmed, including the underwater fight and those on board the C-5 airplane. In his director's cut, Miller said he removed "a lot of stuff" that Cameron thought was important. Miller also said that he and Cameron had many disagreements about lines of dialogue which Miller thought were "poetic and beautiful", while Cameron thought they were unimportant. Because of the lack of full control throughout the project, Miller said he would likely not work with Cameron again, although the two maintained a good relationship. The final cut of the film runs for 128 minutes.

At one point late in production, Miller considered placing the opening scene later in the film, when Sarah is in the motel room explaining John's death to Grace and Dani. However, Miller said this structure "really changed a whole lot of stuff in a negative way" and he ultimately decided to keep it as an opening scene, in order to start the film off by shocking the audience. The opening scene was originally longer as it featured dialogue between Sarah and John. This was cut from the final film as Cameron and Miller believed that the visual effects did not hold up well when the characters spoke. Another deleted scene went into more detail on how Carl knew about other Terminators arriving from the future. The scene, written by Cameron, explained that Carl created a cell phone app to track the arrivals, which disrupt cell phone signals. The scene was removed because it was considered too humorous compared to the rest of the sequence, which has a serious tone as it involves Sarah meeting her son's killer. A shot was deleted from Carl's final fight with the Rev-9 that depicted it ripping flesh off of Carl's arm. Miller said, "We had to walk the line between gross and horrific" and he described the arm skin as "hanging like a big piece of jerky", saying, "That's where we drew the line."

The film contains 2,600 visual effects shots and was edited using Adobe Premiere Pro and Adobe After Effects. The visual effects were provided by Industrial Light & Magic (ILM) and Scanline VFX, supervised by Alex Wang, David Seager, Arek Komorowski. Eric Barba was the production supervisor with help from Blur Studio, Digital Domain, Method Studios, Unit Image, Rebellion VFX, Mammal Studios, Universal Production Partners (UPP), Weta Digital, Les Androïds Associés, The Third Floor, Inc. and Cantina Creative. ILM was initially going to be the sole company working on visual effects, but others were brought on due to the amount of work that had to be done on the film. The Third Floor handled some of the previsualization. Method Studios created visual effects for scenes involving the C-5 airplane and a helicopter crash. The company also created an establishing shot of a military base and several shots set during the border crossing. Blur Studio handled scenes that depict Grace's future as a soldier.

ILM handled the de-aging in the opening scene. ILM's visual effects supervisor, Jeff White, said a lot of work went into the scene to ensure that the characters' faces looked realistic and had the same likenesses as Terminator 2. After seeing the digital head shots, Schwarzenegger provided guidance to the ILM team, which made subtle adjustments to perfect his character's facial movements. The ILM team also created the liquid metal effects of the Rev-9. The team studied time-lapse photography which depicted the growth of algae and fungus and this inspired the liquid metal movements.

According to Cameron in February 2019, the film's working title was Terminator: Dark Fate. This was confirmed as the film's official title the following month.

=== Music and soundtrack ===
Tom Holkenborg composed the film's score, reuniting with director Tim Miller after their collaboration in Deadpool. Holkenborg recreated Brad Fiedel's original "Terminator" theme while also introducing Latino elements to reflect the ethnicity of Dani Ramos. He used approximately 15 instruments while composing the score and also used the sound of an anvil and the banging of a washing machine, describing his score as being "way more aggressive" than Fiedel's. The soundtrack was released digitally on November 1, 2019, by Paramount Music.

== Release ==
=== Marketing ===
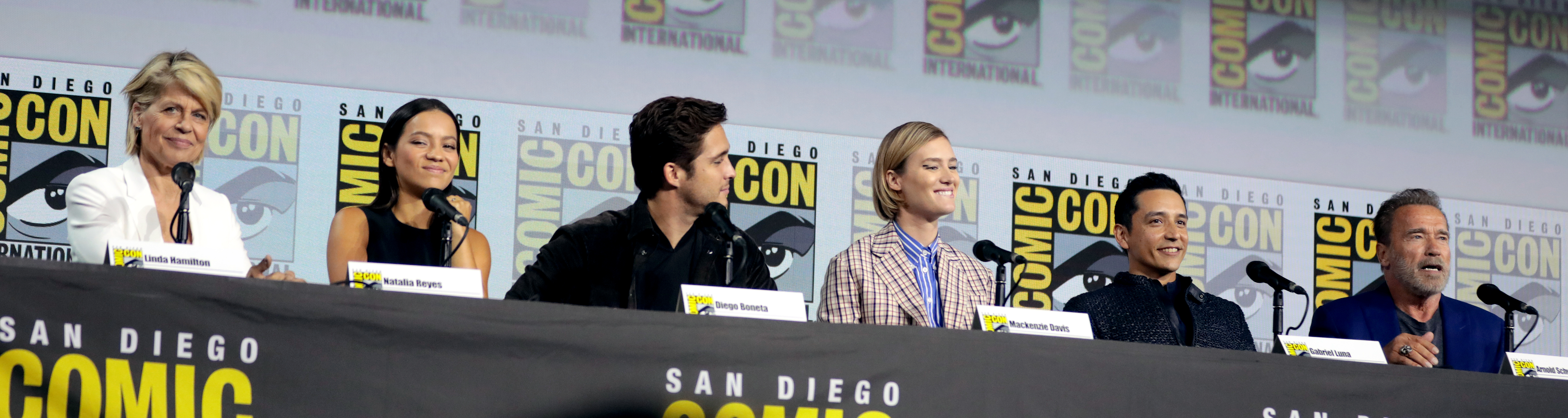
Dark Fate cast members promoting the film at the 2019 San Diego Comic-Con

A first-look promotional image showing Hamilton, Davis and Reyes was released in August 2018. It was the subject of comments which criticized the absence of the Terminator and John Connor and received backlash for its focus on the female cast members. A teaser trailer for the film was released on May 23, 2019, that features a cover version of Björk's "Hunter" performed by John Mark McMillan. The film's theatrical and international trailers were released on August 29, 2019. The trailers' release date marked the anniversary of the original Judgment Day date given in the second film. Initially, the marketing campaign highlighted the return of Cameron and Hamilton. In the final months, the campaign focused more on the film's action and special effects. Promotional partners included Adobe Inc. and Ruffles. In September 2019, Adobe and Paramount Pictures launched a contest for people to create their own remix version of the trailer using Adobe software and assets from the film.

In early October 2019, brief footage of the film was shown during IMAX screenings of Joker. Miller and the cast went on a global press tour to promote the film and Hamilton attended a premiere event in Seoul on October 21, 2019.

In the film, Schwarzenegger's character has a van which advertises "Carl's Draperies 888-512-1984" on the side of it. The number was an actual phone number which, when dialed, plays a recording of Schwarzenegger as Carl. The number references May 12, 1984, the date that Kyle Reese time-travels to in the first film.

=== Theatrical ===
Terminator: Dark Fate was theatrically released in Europe on October 23, 2019 and was also theatrically released on November 1, 2019, by Paramount Pictures in the United States and Canada and 20th Century Fox internationally. On October 19, 2019, Alamo Drafthouse Cinema hosted surprise screenings of the film in 15 theaters, disguised as screenings of Terminator 2: Judgment Day (1991). The premiere event for Terminator: Dark Fate in the United States was to be held on October 28, 2019, at TCL Chinese Theatre in Hollywood, Los Angeles, but it was canceled because of the nearby wildfires.

=== Home media ===
Terminator: Dark Fate was released digitally on January 14, 2020, before its home video releases on 4K Ultra HD, Blu-ray and DVD on January 28. Several deleted scenes were included with the home video release, including one in which Sarah learns that Carl has informed Alicia of his past and his true nature as a killing machine. In another scene, Sarah hijacks a man's vehicle on the highway after Grace and Dani steal hers. Another scene depicts the characters being attacked by guards as they journey towards the border. One deleted scene depicts Grace volunteering herself to an older Dani to send her to the past.

== Reception ==
=== Box office ===
Terminator: Dark Fate grossed $62.3 million in the United States and Canada and $198.9 million in other territories, for a worldwide total of $261.1 million. With a production budget between $185–196 million and an additional $80–100 million spent on marketing and distribution, early estimates stated the film needed to earn over $450 million worldwide to break even. The film ended up losing Paramount, Skydance and other studios $122.6 million. It was labeled a box-office bomb after its dismal opening weekend, and it finished as the second biggest bomb of 2019. As a result of the losses, sources close to Skydance said shortly after the release that there were no plans to continue the franchise.

In the United States and Canada, Dark Fate was released at the same time as Harriet, Arctic Dogs and Motherless Brooklyn and was initially projected to gross $40–47 million from 4,086 theaters in its opening weekend. The film made $2.35 million from Thursday night previews, on a par with the $2.3 million that Genisys made from its Tuesday night previews in 2015, but after making just $10.6 million on its first day, weekend estimates were lowered to $27 million. It went on to debut to $29 million. Although it finished first at the box office, it was the lowest opening in the series since the original film (when accounting for inflation), which was blamed on the lukewarm critical reception, as well as the audience's disinterest in another Terminator film. The film made $10.8 million in its second weekend, dropping 63% and finishing fifth and then $4.3 million in its third weekend, falling to 11th.

In Germany, the film started out with 132,500 viewers, placing it third on that week's charts. In the weekend following its international debut, the film grossed $12.8 million from countries in Europe and Asia, considered a low start. The film was projected to gross $125 million globally during the first weekend of November 2019. Instead, it only made $101.9 million (18% below projections), including $72.9 million overseas. As it did in the U.S., the film under-performed in China, where it opened to just $28.2 million, far below the $40–50 million estimates.

=== Critical response ===
On the review aggregator website Rotten Tomatoes, 70% of 351 critics' reviews are positive, with an average rating of 6.2/10. The website's consensus reads: "Terminator: Dark Fate represents a significant upgrade over its immediate predecessors, even if it lacks the thrilling firepower of the franchise's best installments." Metacritic, which uses a weighted average, assigned the film a score of 54 out of 100, based on 51 critics, indicating "mixed or average" reviews. Audiences polled by CinemaScore gave the film an average grade of "B+" on an A+ to F scale, the same score as its three immediate predecessors, while those at PostTrak gave it an overall positive score of 78%, with 51% saying they would definitely recommend it.

The Hollywood Reporter wrote that critics overall seemed "cautiously excited about Dark Fate, although there's a certain awkwardness about seeing repeated recommendations that it is 'easily the third-best' movie in the series". William Bibbiani of TheWrap wrote that, "Whether Terminator: Dark Fate is the last chapter in this story or the first in an all-new franchise is, for now, irrelevant. The film works either way, bringing the tale of the first two films to a satisfying conclusion while reintroducing the classic storyline, in exciting new ways, to an excited new audience. It's a breathtaking blockbuster, and a welcome return to form." Variety's Owen Gleiberman called the film "the first vital Terminator sequel since Terminator 2" and wrote that "Terminator: Dark Fate is a movie designed to impress you with its scale and visual effects, but it's also a film that returns, in good and gratifying ways, to the smartly packaged low-down genre-thriller classicism that gave the original Terminator its kick."

Joe Morgenstern of The Wall Street Journal gave the film a negative review, describing it as "cobbled together by dunces in a last-ditch effort to wring revenue from a moribund concept. The plot makes no sense—time travel as multiverse Dada. Worse still, it renders meaningless the struggles that gave the first two films of the franchise an epic dimension." Jefferey M. Anderson of Common Sense Media gave the movie two out of five stars: "This sixth Terminator movie erases the events of the previous three (dud) sequels but winds up feeling half-erased itself. It's like a dull, pale, irrelevant carbon copy of a once glorious hit." Christy Lemire of RogerEbert.com gave Dark Fate two out of four stars, arguing that it suffered from "empty fanservice" and that Hamilton "deserves better" as does her supporting female cast. David Ehrlich of IndieWire praised Hamilton's performance and the movie's digital recreations of her, Furlong's and Schwarzenegger's younger likenesses, but concluded that "this painfully generic action movie proves that the Terminator franchise is obsolete". Tasha Robinson of The Verge stated that some combat sequences "are staged clearly and cleanly", while others "are packed with CGI blurs and muddy action and are hard to follow in even the most basic 'who's where, and are they dead?' kind of way. And when Dark Fate does deign to explain what's going on, it delivers its exposition in a self-important, hushed, clumsy way, as if audiences should be astonished by the most basic plot revelations."

Peter Bradshaw of The Guardian awarded it two stars out of five, stating "The Terminator franchise has come clanking robotically into view once again with its sixth film – it absolutely will not stop – not merely repeating itself but somehow repeating the repetitions." While he wrote that it was "good to see Hamilton getting a robust role", he added that "sadly, she has to concede badass superiority to Davis." He concluded by writing, "This sixth Terminator surely has to be the last. Yet the very nature of the Terminator story means that going round and round in existential circles comes with the territory." Richard Roeper of the Chicago Sun-Times awarded the film two stars out of four, calling it a "boring retread" and "so derivative of Judgment Day", although he welcomed the return of Linda Hamilton, praised an "impressively effective" Mackenzie Davis and the "winning screen presence" of Natalia Reyes." Angie Han of Mashable found the film underwhelming and its title to be quite apt: "Dark Fate is too thinly sketched to be anything but pastiche. It feels like a Terminator movie spit out by a machine designed to make Terminator movies. A dark fate for the franchise, indeed."

Regarding the film's mixed reception, Tim Miller believed that some audiences were predisposed to dislike the film after being disappointed by the last three films, adding that some audiences "hate it because it's the sixth movie, and Hollywood should be making original movies and not repeating franchises". Miller later gave a more blunt assessment in 2022: "Terminator's an interesting movie to explore, but maybe we've explored it enough. I went in with the rock hard nerd belief that if I made a good movie that I wanted to see, it would do well. And I was wrong. It was one of those f**king Eureka moments in a bad way because the movie tanked."

James Cameron reflected on Dark Fate in 2022: "I'm actually reasonably happy with the film ... I think the problem, and I'm going to wear this one, is that I refused to do it without Arnold ... And then Tim wanted Linda. I think what happened is I think the movie could have survived having Linda in it, I think it could have survived having Arnold in it, but when you put Linda and Arnold in it and then, you know, she's 60-something, he's 70-something, all of a sudden it wasn't your Terminator movie, it wasn't even your dad's Terminator movie, it was your granddad's Terminator movie. And we didn't see that ... it was just our own myopia. We kind of got a little high on our own supply and I think that's the lesson there."

Schwarzenegger also gave a blunt assessment in a 2023 interview about the franchise: "The first three movies were great. Number four [Salvation] I was not in because I was governor. Then five [Genisys] and six [Dark Fate] didn't close the deal as far as I'm concerned. We knew that ahead of time because they were just not well written."

In 2024, Cameron continued to defend Dark Fate, ranking it as the third-best film in the Terminator franchise, behind his own two films. He maintained that the film had succeeded creatively, attributing its commercial failure to a lack of audience interest rather than its quality.

Linda Hamilton expressed a more mixed opinion in 2024. Although she was glad to have reprised her role as Sarah Connor and praised her collaborators, she admitted, “I can’t say I love the film.” Having watched it only once, she felt that its pacing was too fast, despite being proud of the work accomplished during production.

Mackenzie Davis defended the film in a 2020 interview, saying that she loved the finished product and was proud of the cast and crew’s work. Nevertheless, she acknowledged that its poor box-office performance indicated insufficient audience demand for another Terminator installment and questioned the need for a further sequel.

==== Fate of John Connor ====
The death of John Connor early in the film was criticized by both critics and fans. Fred Hawson of News.ABS-CBN.com wrote that, "deciding to lose John Connor early on in this one made the emotional heart of the first two classic Terminator films stop beating as well." Richard Roeper argued that killing John Connor ruined what the previous two films established: "Even though Dark Fate tosses aside the third, fourth and fifth entries in the series like a Terminator disposing of a hapless cop, it also undercuts the impact of the first film and the follow-up (which is one of the two or three greatest sequels of all time). First, they get rid of the John Connor character in almost casual fashion."

Corey Plante of Inverse, who was critical of Furlong's portrayal of the character in Terminator 2, nonetheless found his character's death off-putting: "The character at the focus of every previous Terminator movie—the same young boy I irrationally hated since I was a young boy myself—was dead. Needless to say, it rattled me." He also found that replacing him with new heroes undermined the Connors' importance established in the previous films: "The future that made [Sarah Connor] important died with John, and now there's a new Terminator story with a new set of heroes that makes it seem like no matter how many times Skynet or its next iteration sends a murder robot back in time to kill someone, there will always be a new hero waiting to rise up." Robert Yaniz Jr. of CheatSheet described the twist as unthinkable: "In an instant, the entire crux of the franchise—the human resistance led by John—is torn away."

Matt Goldberg of Collider felt the opening did irreparable damage to the legacy of Terminator 2, by rendering it pointless: "Every sequel since has diminished the ending of Judgment Day because the story 'needs' to continue (because studios like money and can't leave well enough alone). But Terminator: Dark Fate may be the worst offender thus far as its prologue directly follows T2 and goes for shock value rather than considering what it means to continue the narrative." Richard Trenholm of CNET felt the opening twist summed up everything wrong with Dark Fate: "The joy [of seeing the de-aged characters] instantly becomes cringeworthy, as this prologue undermines Terminator 2 by killing a major character in such a cursory fashion it just feels silly." Ian Sandwell of Digital Spy suggested that the twist was not particularly important, given that in the other films, John Connor only exists to "motivate the other characters and sets the plot in motion" and that John's role as a future leader had already been rendered moot through the elimination of Skynet.

About the controversial scene, Furlong also expressed his displeasure and hoped to reprise the role in full in a future film. Linda Hamilton also voiced her opinion that the scene would upset fans, as she considered John to be the true main protagonist of the franchise. Nick Stahl, who portrayed John in Terminator 3: Rise of the Machines, also expressed interest in reprising the role in a possible seventh film.

Cathal Gunning of Screen Rant noted the similarity between the decision to kill off John Connor in the opening scene to the deaths of Newt and Corporal Dwayne Hicks in Alien 3, which was criticized by Cameron, who had directed the preceding film, Aliens.

=== Accolades ===
Terminator: Dark Fate received a nomination for Outstanding Special (Practical) Effects in a Photoreal or Animated Project at the 18th Visual Effects Society Awards. At the 2020 Dragon Awards, the film received a nomination for Best Science Fiction or Fantasy Movie. It was nominated in two categories at the 2021 Golden Trailer Awards: "Talk" (Create Advertising Group) for Best Action and "Non Stop" (Aspect Ratio) for Best Home Ent Action. Terminator: Dark Fate received three Saturn Award nominations for Best Science Fiction Film, Best Supporting Actress (for Hamilton) and Best Special Effects in 2021.

== Other media ==
=== Video games ===
The 2019 video game Gears 5 allows the player to play as either Sarah Connor with Hamilton voicing her character, Grace or a T-800 Terminator model. The game was released on September 6, 2019. The T-800 model was later a downloadable playable character in Mortal Kombat 11, using Schwarzenegger's likeness, but without the actor voicing the character; he was voiced by Chris Cox instead of Schwarzenegger. The downloadable content was released on October 8, 2019.

A mobile game, titled Terminator: Dark Fate – The Game, was released in October 2019.

The PC game, Terminator: Dark Fate – Defiance, developed by Slitherine Software in collaboration with Skydance, was released on February 21, 2024. It is a real-time tactics game that takes place ten years after the Judgment Day, during the war between humans and Legion. The player assumes the role of Lieutenant Alex Church, a commander of the Founders, a group consisting of ex-U.S. military personnel. A multiplayer mode features two other playable factions: Movement (a human resistance organization) and Legion. The game received "mixed or average" reviews according to Metacritic, with a score of 72 out of 100. Alex Avard of Empire found the quality of Terminator games to be inconsistent, but wrote that Dark Fate – Defiance, with its "tightly designed" gameplay, "may have just helped to raise that historically low bar a little bit higher." Jon Bolding of IGN criticized the game's difficulty.

=== Toys ===
National Entertainment Collectibles Association released action figures based on the film and Chronicle Collectibles released an 18-inch T-800 statue.

== Post-release ==
=== Canceled sequels ===
Plans for a new Terminator film trilogy were announced in July 2017. While working on the story for Terminator: Dark Fate that year, Cameron and the writers envisioned the film as the first in the new trilogy. They also worked out the basic storylines for each planned film. In October 2019, Cameron said that sequels to Terminator: Dark Fate would further explore the relationship between humans and artificial intelligence, while stating that a resolution between the two feuding sides would be the ultimate outcome. That month, Schwarzenegger said that Cameron would write the Terminator: Dark Fate sequels and that Cameron would begin work on the next film in early 2020, for release in 2022.

Although the events of Terminator: Dark Fate erase Schwarzenegger's T-800 character from existence, Cameron did not rule out the possibility of Schwarzenegger reprising the character, saying, "Look, if we make a ton of money with this film [Dark Fate] and the cards say that they like Arnold, I think Arnold can come back. I'm a writer. I can think of scenarios. We don't have a plan for that right now, let me put it that way." Hamilton said in October 2019 that she would probably reprise her role for a sequel, although she joked that she would fake her own death to avoid appearing in it, saying that making Terminator: Dark Fate "really was hard" because of the physical training she had to undergo. In April 2024, Hamilton confirmed that she was done with the role.

Following the film's performance at the box office, sources close to Skydance told The Hollywood Reporter that there are no plans for further films. In June 2020, star Mackenzie Davis expressed: "I really loved the movie and I'm so proud of what we did, but there wasn't a demand for it [at the box office] and to think that there'd be a demand for a seventh film is quite insane. You should just pay attention to what audiences want". Later in December, Davis went on to reveal that the seventh film would not have been a sequel to Dark Fate, but a spin-off focusing on an alternate timeline version of Grace set in the future war similar to Terminator Salvation and would not have featured Schwarzenegger.

=== Reboot ===
It was later reported in May 2023 that Cameron was developing a script for a Terminator reboot.
