= Gopher Broke =

Gopher Broke may refer to:

- Gopher Broke (1958 film), a Warner Bros. Looney Tunes cartoon short
- Gopher Broke (2004 film), an animated short film
