= Jeff Fowler =

American filmmaker

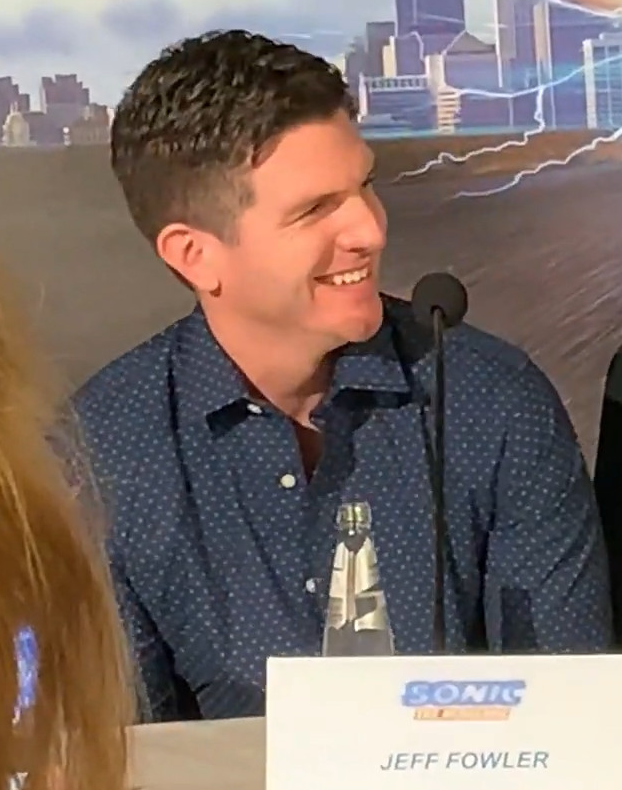
- Fowler in 2020
- Born: July 27, 1978 (age 48); Normal, Illinois
- Education: Ringling College of Art and Design (graduated 2002)
- Occupations: Film director; animator
- Years active: 2002–present
- Employer: Blur Studio
- Known for: Sonic the Hedgehog film series (2020-present)
- Jeff Fowler's voice On working on Shadow the Hedgehog and later Sonic the Hedgehog 3 Recording published October 30, 2024

Jeff Fowler (born July 27, 1978) is an American film director and animator. He is best known for directing the Sonic the Hedgehog film series. He was also nominated for the Academy Award for Best Animated Short Film for Gopher Broke (2004).

== Career ==
Fowler chose to pursue a career as a computer animator during his high school years in the 1990s, when computer animation was being popularized in film. According to Fowler, the film Toy Story profoundly impacted him. Fowler attended the Ringling College of Art and Design, majoring in computer animation. His thesis, the short film Monkey's Pit, attracted the attention of Blur Studio co-founder Tim Miller, who offered him employment at Blur after his graduation from Ringling in 2002.

Fowler was an animator for the 2003 short film Rockfish and the 2009 film Where the Wild Things Are. In 2004, he wrote, directed, storyboarded, did the art layout, and animated Gopher Broke, which was nominated for an Academy Award for Best Animated Short Film. He also wrote and animated A Gentleman's Duel. Fowler worked on the CGI movie production for the 2005 video game Shadow the Hedgehog.

Later, he directed Sonic the Hedgehog, a film based on the video game series of the same name. The film was originally set to release in November 2019, but due to widespread criticism toward Sonic's design, it was delayed to February 14, 2020, to change the design. The new design for Sonic was revealed in November 2019, garnering far more positive responses from fans and critics. Fowler directed a sequel to Sonic the Hedgehog titled Sonic the Hedgehog 2, which released on April 8, 2022. He is set to direct a reboot of The Pink Panther, which is in development. He directed the pilot episode and executive-produced the TV series Knuckles, and directed Sonic the Hedgehog 3, which released in December 2024 to positive reviews.

Fowler is set to return as the director for the fourth Sonic film, which is scheduled for a March 19, 2027 release. Filming started on March 2, 2026.

== Filmography ==
=== Director ===
Short film

Year	Title	Notes
2002	Monkey's Pit	University thesis project
2004	Gopher Broke	Also writer, storyboard artist, layout artist, and animator

Feature film

Year	Title	Notes
2020	Sonic the Hedgehog	Feature directorial debut
2022	Sonic the Hedgehog 2	Also cameo as news anchor (deleted scene)
2024	Sonic the Hedgehog 3	Also executive producer
2027	Sonic the Hedgehog 4	

Television

Year	Title	Notes
2024	Knuckles	Miniseries; Episode "The Warrior", Also executive producer

=== Other credits ===
Short film

Year	Title	Role
2003	Rockfish	Animator
2006	A Gentlemen's Duel	Writer and animator

Video game

Year	Title	Role
2005	Shadow the Hedgehog	CGI movie production

Film

Year	Title	Role
2009	Where the Wild Things Are	Animation research and development
