= Tim Miller (director) =

American filmmaker (born 1964)

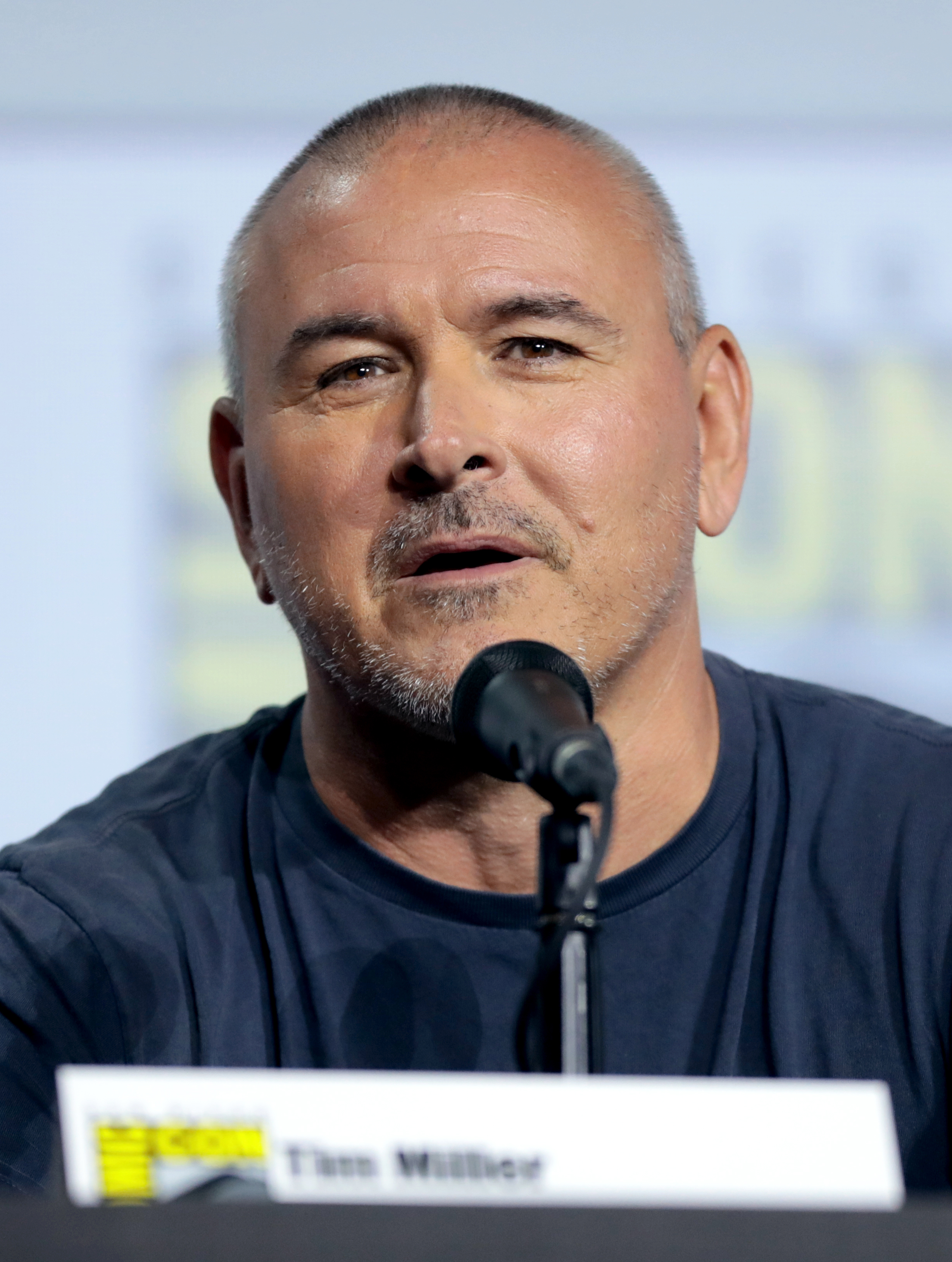
- Miller at the 2019 San Diego Comic-Con promoting Terminator: Dark Fate
- Born: Timothy Miller; October 10, 1964 (age 61); Fort Washington, Maryland, U.S.
- Occupations: Film director; film producer; screenwriter; animator; visual effects artist
- Years active: 1995–present
- Known for: Deadpool; Terminator: Dark Fate; Love, Death & Robots; Co-founder of Blur Studio
- Awards: See below

Timothy Miller (born October 10, 1964) is an American filmmaker, animator, and visual effects artist. He is best known for directing the films Deadpool (2016) and Terminator: Dark Fate (2019). He is also the creator of the animated anthology series Love, Death & Robots (2019–present), for which he has won three Primetime Emmy Awards for Outstanding Short Form Animated Program.

Miller is the co-founder of the visual effects company Blur Studio. He was nominated for an Academy Award for Best Animated Short Film as co-story writer and executive producer of the short animated film Gopher Broke (2004). He also designed the title sequences of The Girl with the Dragon Tattoo (2011) and Thor: The Dark World (2013).

== Early life ==
Miller was born in Fort Washington, Maryland. He studied illustration and animation in college.

== Career ==
=== Visual effects and animation ===
In March 1995, Miller co-founded Blur Studio, a visual effects, animation and design company with David Stinnett and Cat Chapman. Miller and Jeff Fowler were nominated for the Academy Award for Best Animated Short Film in 2005 for the short film Gopher Broke.

In March 2008, Miller was set to produce and direct one of eight animated tales based on the Heavy Metal magazine. David Fincher and Kevin Eastman were also attached to produce and direct a story segment. Miller was set by Legendary Pictures on March 15, 2012 to direct a live-action adaptation of the Warren Ellis comic book series Gravel, from a script by Oliver Butcher and Stephen Cornwell. On November 14, 2012, Sony Pictures set Miller to direct Joe Haldeman's science fiction novella Seasons, which Sebastian Gutierrez was set to adapt and Michael De Luca to produce. Miller and Jeff Fowler are also set to direct and produce the animated film The Goon through their Blur Studio. As of 2024, these films are still in development.

Miller designed the title sequences of the film The Girl with the Dragon Tattoo (2011), and of the film Thor: The Dark World (2013). The latter was completed in 12 weeks and included 75 shots, most of which were computer-generated.

=== Director ===
On April 8, 2011, Miller was hired by 20th Century Fox to direct the feature film Deadpool, based on the Marvel Comics character of the same name. It was his directorial debut, and was written by Rhett Reese and Paul Wernick, with Ryan Reynolds starring in the title role. Filming began late March 2015 in Vancouver, and the film was released on February 12, 2016. Miller was set to direct the sequel, Deadpool 2, released in 2018, but he departed the project due to creative differences with Reynolds.

In January 2017, Deadline reported that Miller was in talks with James Cameron to work on and possibly direct a new Terminator film. Skydance Media confirmed in September 2017 that Miller would direct the next Terminator film. The title of the film was officially announced as Terminator: Dark Fate in 2019. During production of the film, when asked about backlash regarding the female main characters, Miller said that Mackenzie Davis's character Grace would "scare the fuck" out of "closet misogynist[s]." Despite favorable reviews, the film became a box-office bomb, losing upwards of $100 million.

In mid-2017, Miller was hired to direct an adaptation of William Gibson's 1984 science-fiction novel Neuromancer for Fox, which will be produced by Simon Kinberg.

In January 2023, Eli Roth's film Borderlands went through two weeks of reshoots directed by Miller, due to Roth's participation in Thanksgiving, a slasher film that was initially created by Roth as a parody trailer for Grindhouse but has since been promoted to a feature-length film. While Roth was not involved with the reshoots for Borderlands, he remained involved with the movie and gave Miller both his blessing and credit as an executive producer.

In October 2025, Warner Bros. Pictures entered talks to purchase a sci-fi film directed by Miller titled Shiver, which will star Keanu Reeves and be produced by Aaron Ryder and Matthew Vaughn. The film is scheduled to be released in the United States by Warner Bros. Pictures on August 13, 2027.

=== Producer ===
In October 2016, Miller was hired to serve as executive producer for a Sonic the Hedgehog feature film, originally being set to be produced by Sony Pictures, before being acquired by Paramount Pictures. Miller and director Jeff Fowler first created a pitch for a Sonic movie with Ben Schwartz voicing the character. After the movie was green-lighted by Paramount, the two chose to cast Schwartz as the voice of Sonic in the film, having enjoyed his performance in the test reading. The film was released on February 14, 2020, and received a warm critical and commercial reception. Miller returned as executive producer for the film's sequel, released on April 8, 2022.

Miller created the anthology series Secret Level, which premiered on Amazon Prime Video on December 10, 2024.

== Filmography ==
=== Short film ===
Year	Title	Director	Writer	Executive producer	Notes
2002	Aunt Luisa	Yes	Story	No	Co-directed with Paul Taylor
2003	RockFish	Yes	Yes	No	Also animation supervisor
2004	Gopher Broke	No	Story	Yes	
2004	In the Rough	No	Story	Yes	
2006	A Gentlemen's Duel	No	Yes	Yes	

=== Feature film ===
Year	Title	Director	Executive producer	Notes
2016	Deadpool	Yes	No	
2019	Terminator: Dark Fate	Yes	Yes	Also co-creative consultant
2020	Sonic the Hedgehog	No	Yes	
2022	Sonic the Hedgehog 2	No	Yes	
2024	Borderlands	Uncredited	Yes	Directed reshoots
2024	Sonic the Hedgehog 3	No	Yes	
2027	Shiver	Yes	No	Filming

=== Television ===
Year	Title	Director	Writer	Executive producer	Creator	Notes
2019–present	Love, Death & Robots	Yes	Yes	Yes	Yes	Directed 5 episodes, Wrote 5 episodes
2024–present	Secret Level	No	Yes	Yes	Yes	Writer: "Exodus: Odyssey"

=== Technical credits ===
==== Film ====
Year	Title	Role
1995	Hideaway	Visual effects
2001	Soulkeeper	Creative supervisor (Blur Studio sequences)
2004	Mickey's Twice Upon a Christmas	Creative director
2010	Scott Pilgrim vs. the World	Creative supervisor (Ninja Ninja sequence)
2011	The Girl with the Dragon Tattoo	Creative director (Title sequence)
2013	Thor: The Dark World	Second unit director (Opening sequence)

==== Video game ====
Year	Title	Role
2005	Shadow the Hedgehog	Visual effects producer
2007	Hellgate: London	Visual effects
2010	Mass Effect 2	Visual effects producer
2011	Star Wars: The Old Republic	Visual effects producer

== Accolades ==
Year	Award	Category	Work	Result	Ref.
2005	77th Academy Awards	Best Animated Short Film	Gopher Broke	Nominated	
2008	Visual Effects Society Awards	Outstanding Pre-Rendered Visuals in a Video Game	Hellgate: London	Nominated	
2010	Visual Effects Society Awards	Outstanding Visual Effects in a Video Game Trailer	Star Wars: The Old Republic	Nominated	
2010	Visual Effects Society Awards	Outstanding Visual Effects in a Video Game Trailer	Mass Effect 2	Nominated	
2011	Visual Effects Society Awards	Outstanding Animated Commercial	Dante's Inferno	Nominated	
2011	Visual Effects Society Awards	Outstanding Visual Effects in a Video Game Trailer	Star Wars: The Old Republic	Nominated	
2017	69th Directors Guild of America Awards	Outstanding Directing – First-Time Feature Film	Deadpool	Nominated	
2017	Hugo Awards	Best Dramatic Presentation	Deadpool	Nominated	
2019	71st Primetime Emmy Awards	Outstanding Short Form Animated Program	Love, Death & Robots	Won	
2021	73rd Primetime Emmy Awards	Outstanding Short Form Animated Program	Love, Death & Robots	Won	
2022	74th Primetime Creative Arts Emmy Awards	Outstanding Short Form Animated Program	Love, Death & Robots	Won	
