= Gopher Broke (2004 film) =

- Release poster
- Directed by: Jeff Fowler
- Written by: Jeff Fowler
- Produced by: Al Shier
- Starring: Greg Berg
- Music by: Rob Cairns; Tony Morales
- Production company: Blur Studio
- Release date: September 30, 2004
- Running time: 4 minutes
- Country: United States

Gopher Broke is a 2004 American animated short film written and directed by Jeff Fowler and executive produced by Tim Miller at Blur Studio. The film is about a hungry gopher who hatches a clever plan to get a quick snack, but discovers that even the best laid plans can go awry. The short film was also released in theaters with Doogal.

== Synopsis ==
A gopher finds himself on a road where trucks are hauling produce to market. He hits on the idea of shaking some of the produce loose for himself, but other animals always beat him to the punch. That is, until a truck comes along with a cow.

== Production ==
Gopher Broke is the fourth short film produced by Blur Studio. The short was in production for five months with a team of 25 people. Tools included 3D Studio Max, Brazil R/S, Digital Fusion, and 100 IBM IntelliStation Z workstations. After directing two of the company's last three shorts, executive producer Tim Miller gave up the director's chair to Jeff Fowler. Miller admitted that slapstick comedy was not one of his own strengths. The short was pitched to Nickelodeon, but Fowler told the network the studio had no feature plans for it when asked.

== Accolades ==
The film was nominated for the 2004 Academy Award for Best Animated Short Film. It is the fourth Blur film shortlisted for an Oscar in three years and the first to be nominated.
