= Sonic the Hedgehog 4 (film) =

Upcoming film by Jeff Fowler

- Official logo
- Directed by: Jeff Fowler
- Based on: Sonic the Hedgehog by Sega (Note: Sonic the Hedgehog was developed by Sonic Team, published by Sega, directed and programmed by Yuji Naka, designed by Hirokazu Yasuhara, and illustrated by Naoto Ohshima.)
- Produced by: Neal H. Moritz; Toby Ascher; Toru Nakahara
- Starring: Ben Schwartz; Kristen Bell; Idris Elba; Jim Carrey; Keanu Reeves; James Marsden; Tika Sumpter; Ben Kingsley; Matt Berry; Colleen O'Shaughnessey; Lee Majdoub; Nick Offerman; Richard Ayoade
- Cinematography: Brandon Trost
- Edited by: Al LeVine
- Production company: Original Film
- Distributed by: Paramount Pictures
- Release date: March 19, 2027
- Country: United States
- Language: English

Sonic the Hedgehog 4 is an upcoming American action-adventure comedy film based on the Sonic the Hedgehog video game series. The fourth in the Sonic film series, it was directed by Jeff Fowler. Jim Carrey, Ben Schwartz, Idris Elba, Keanu Reeves, James Marsden, Tika Sumpter, Colleen O'Shaughnessey, and Lee Majdoub reprise their roles, with Kristen Bell joining the voice cast as Amy Rose. Ben Kingsley, Matt Berry, Nick Offerman, and Richard Ayoade are cast in undisclosed roles.

Sonic the Hedgehog 4 was reported to be in development in December 2024, just before the release of Sonic the Hedgehog 3. Fowler and the producers were confirmed to return soon after. Principal photography began in March 2026 and wrapped in May. The cast was confirmed in March 2026, alongside the film's title announcement. The plot will draw elements from video game Sonic CD (1993). It is scheduled for release by Paramount Pictures in the United States on March 19, 2027.

== Cast ==
=== Voices ===
- Ben Schwartz as Sonic the Hedgehog, a blue hedgehog who can run at supersonic speeds
- Kristen Bell as Amy Rose, a pink hedgehog who wields a large hammer
- Idris Elba as Knuckles the Echidna, a hot-headed red echidna warrior with super strength
- Keanu Reeves as Shadow the Hedgehog, a red-striped black hedgehog who possesses many abilities similar to Sonic.
- Colleen O'Shaughnessey as Miles "Tails" Prower, an intelligent yellow fox who can fly with his twin-tails and creates gadgets

Additionally, Ben Kingsley and Nick Offerman will appear in undisclosed voice roles.

=== Live-action ===
- Jim Carrey as Dr. Ivo Robotnik, a mad scientist and Sonic's arch-nemesis whom he often refers to as "Eggman"
- James Marsden as Tom Wachowski, the adoptive father of Sonic, Tails, and Knuckles, and the sheriff of Green Hills, Montana
- Tika Sumpter as Maddie Wachowski, Tom's wife, the adoptive mother of Sonic, Tails, and Knuckles, and the local veterinarian of Green Hills
- Lee Majdoub as Agent Stone, Robotnik's sycophantic assistant

Matt Berry and Richard Ayoade will additionally appear in undisclosed roles.

== Production ==
=== Development ===
In September 2024, producer Toby Ascher stated that additional installments were planned for the Sonic the Hedgehog film series. In November 2024, it was revealed by director Jeff Fowler that Sonic the Hedgehog 3 would tease new characters to appear in a fourth film. Sonic the Hedgehog 3's mid-credits scene features Amy Rose saving Sonic by smashing an army of Metal Sonic robots. According to writers Pat Casey and Josh Miller, Amy had been considered for a larger role in the film, but was excluded so that the script could focus on Shadow the Hedgehog. In December 2024, the fourth film was officially greenlit. Fowler returned to direct, and Toku Nakahara, as well as Neal H. Moritz and Toby Ascher of Original Film returned to produce.

Later in December 2024, Casey and Miller expressed interest in taking Sonic on adventures to worlds beyond Earth. In January 2025, concept art for Sonic the Hedgehog 3 was released online by Tacit Sign Studio, including art depicting Amy and Metal Sonic in scenes either not present or significantly different in the final film. Though the art was later removed, its release fueled fan theories that Sonic the Hedgehog 4 would take inspiration from Sonic CD, which was the debut of both Amy and Metal Sonic in the games. In response to the speculation, Miller said it could not be openly discussed at that time, as those elements may potentially appear in future films. Fowler acknowledged the connection to CD, saying that their simultaneous introduction was intended to "honor that chronology", but stated that the film's story would not be solely based on CD.

=== Casting ===
Keanu Reeves, Idris Elba, and Jim Carrey had expressed interest in reprising their roles from previous installments. In February 2026, Kristen Bell was cast as the voice of Amy, with Ben Schwartz returning to reprise his role as Sonic. In March, journalist Jeff Sneider indicated that Ben Kingsley was cast in "a key role". The rest of the cast was revealed later that month, including Nick Offerman in the voice cast; Offerman and Bell had previously appeared alongside Schwartz in the television series Parks and Recreation. Additionally, Matt Berry and Richard Ayoade had also joined the cast in undisclosed roles.

Fowler stated in a January 2025 interview that someone could be cast as the voice of Metal Sonic, saying that although the character does not speak in most appearances, the possibility of the film version of the character having a voice was likely to be raised during the film's scripting process.

=== Filming and voice recording ===
Principal photography began on March 2, 2026, with Fowler announcing it on social media by a picture of him holding Amy's hammer. Filming occurred at Shinfield Studios in Berkshire. Filming wrapped on May 15, 2026, as announced through Instagram alongside a photo of Fowler next to a Metal Sonic prop. Brandon Trost served as the film's cinematographer. On May 27, 2026, Ben Schwartz posted a photo of himself with Fowler and the film's editor Al LeVine in a vocal recording booth, confirming that voice recording for the film had commenced. On June 3, 2026, Kristen Bell uploaded to Instagram a photo of her in a recording studio, about to record her voice lines as Amy.

=== Post-production ===
Al LeVine serves as film editor.

== Release ==
=== Theatrical ===
Sonic the Hedgehog 4 is scheduled to be released in the United States on March 19, 2027, by Paramount Pictures.

=== Marketing ===
A teaser trailer was released on March 19, 2026, featuring Jim Carrey reprising his role as Dr. Ivo Robotnik. Carrey's return was considered particularly notable, given an appearance he made in February 2026 for the Honorary César that sparked conspiracies of cloning or impersonation and the fact that Carrey variously mentioned retirement in the past despite repeatedly returning. The Chaos Emeralds with different characters' faces are seen in the teaser and the use of the "Sonic Boom" theme from Sonic CD were also subjects of commentary. Footage from the film featuring Carrey was showcased at CinemaCon in April 2026 and more footage was privately shown at CineEurope in June 2026.

== See also ==
- List of films based on video games
