= Blur Studio =

American visual effects and computer animation studio

Blur Studio Inc.
- Logo used since 2004
- Type: Private
- Industry: CGI animation VFX; Animation
- Founded: September 20, 1994; 32 years ago
- Founder: David Stinnett; Tim Miller; Cat Chapman
- Headquarters: Culver City, California
- Key people: Tim Miller; David Stinnett; Al Shier
- Products: Films; Television series Video games
- Website: blur.com

Blur Studio Inc. is an American visual effects and computer animation company which specializes in CGI visual effects, CGI animation, and CGI design. Located in Culver City, California, the studio has produced CGI-animated films, teasers and ad spots for television, as well as video-game CGI cinematics.

== History ==
Blur Studio was founded in March 1995 by David Stinnett, Tim Miller, and Cat Chapman. Blur produced Xbox demo video Two to Tango for console's mascots Raven and Robot. Sometime between 2001 and 2003, the studio took interest in The Lego Group's Bionicle theme and produced a short test pitch, under the title "Tahu Nuva vs Kohrak", but Lego had ultimately passed on the project.

The studio worked on the 2004 short film Gopher Broke which was nominated for 2004 Academy Award for Best Animated Short Film.

In 2009, they assisted with the creation of CGI environments in the Academy Award-winning film Avatar.

In 2011, Blur created the opening title sequence for The Girl with the Dragon Tattoo, based on the first book of Stieg Larsson's Millennium Trilogy and directed by David Fincher.

They created the "Heaven and Hell" sequence for South Park: Bigger, Longer & Uncut.

Blur Studio produced a cinematic trailer for the video game PlanetSide 2 titled "Death is No Excuse." They were also responsible for the cinematic trailers of Batman: Arkham City, Batman: Arkham Origins and Batman: Arkham Knight, as well as BioShock, BioShock 2 and BioShock Infinite. They remade the Halo 2 cutscenes for Halo: The Master Chief Collection (2014) and produced the cutscenes for Halo Wars 2 (2017) after doing so for Halo Wars (2009).

In 2016, Miller and the studio returned to the Sonic the Hedgehog franchise and were involved with the film adaptation of the series which was in development at Sony Pictures until they put the project into turnaround and sold the rights to Paramount Pictures in 2017. The film was released on February 14, 2020, in collaboration with Sega and their animation studio, Marza Animation Planet, and Original Film. A sequel was released on April 8, 2022.

In 2017, Blur created another opening title sequence for the Netflix psychological thriller, Mindhunter based on the 1995 true-crime book, Mindhunter: Inside the FBI's Elite Serial Crime Unit by John E. Douglas and Mark Olshaker, produced and directed by David Fincher.

In 2019, the studio produced the animation for the Netflix anthology series Love, Death & Robots, created by Tim Miller, and also produced the second volume of the series. On May 16, 2019, it was announced that Blur Studio's film The Goon, based on the 1999 comic of the same name by Eric Powell, secured a distribution deal with 20th Century Fox and Chernin Entertainment.

== Works ==
=== Film and television ===
Year	Title
1999	South Park: Bigger, Longer & Uncut
2004	Mickey's Twice Upon a Christmas
2009	Avatar
2011	The Girl with the Dragon Tattoo
2013	Man of Steel
2015	Avengers: Age of Ultron
2016	Deadpool
2017	Mindhunter
2019	Love, Death & Robots
2020	Sonic the Hedgehog
2022	Sonic the Hedgehog 2
2024	Knuckles
2024	Secret Level
2024	Sonic the Hedgehog 3

=== Games ===
Year	Title
1998	CarnEvil
2000	Star Trek: Armada
2001	Quake III Revolution
2001	Grand Theft Auto III
2001	Return to Castle Wolfenstein
2002	BloodRayne
2002	Spider-Man
2002	Grand Theft Auto: Vice City
2003	Midnight Club II
2003	Need for Speed: Underground
2003	Crimson Skies: High Road to Revenge
2004	BloodRayne 2
2004	Grand Theft Auto: San Andreas
2004	Spider-Man 2
2005	Midnight Club 3: Dub Edition
2005	X-Men Legends II: Rise of Apocalypse
2005	Shadow the Hedgehog
2006	Sonic the Hedgehog
2006	Rise of Nations: Rise of Legends
2007	BioShock
2009	Halo Wars
2009	Prototype
2010	BioShock 2
2010	Star Wars: The Force Unleashed 2
2011	Star Wars: The Old Republic
2014	Dark Souls II
2014	Halo 2 Anniversary
2016	Call of Duty: Infinite Warfare
2017	Halo Wars 2
2019	Call of Duty: Modern Warfare
2020	Valorant
2022	Call of Duty: Modern Warfare II
2023	Call of Duty: Modern Warfare III
2024	Call of Duty: Black Ops 6

=== Rides ===
Year	Title
2003	SpongeBob SquarePants 4-D
2005	Time Riders
2008	The Simpsons Ride

=== Commercials ===
Year	Title
2002-2003	Kids' WB
2009	Goldfish
2023	Exodus

== Links ==
- Official website
- Blur Studio API's, Libraries and Tools (blur-dev)
- Making of Warhammer Online: Age of Reckoning Trailer at Gnomon Events
