= List of PlayStation Home Game Spaces =

An example of a game space. The Everybody's Golf Space (Europe), Hot Shots Golf Lounge (Asia & North America), Minna no Golf Lounge (Japan).

This is a list of PlayStation Home Game Spaces that were released in the PlayStation Home Open Beta, with the exception of the two Far Cry 2 spaces and the Uncharted: Drake's Fortune space that were released during the Closed Beta. This page also includes the list of PlayStation Home Game Developer Spaces and the list of PlayStation Home Non-gaming Company Spaces. PlayStation Home started an open beta test on December 11, 2008, and closed on March 31, 2015.

Outso is a developing company that developed some of the Game Spaces for Home. Outso was responsible for making the Uncharted 2: Among Thieves, inFAMOUS, Resistance 2 and Warhawk spaces for the respective games developer. They also made the mini-games in those spaces as well as the SOCOM Telestrator in the SOCOM space.

== Game Spaces ==
This list is for all of the Game Spaces that were released in PlayStation Home. Game Spaces generally depicted a level of the game itself and had mini-games or interactions related to the game and were used to promote the game. There were over thirty Game Spaces released in PlayStation Home from either Sony Computer Entertainment or various third-party developers. Clap Hanz, Naughty Dog, Incognito Entertainment, Evolution Studios, Sucker Punch Productions, and Media Molecule are developing companies of SCE.

This list is in alphabetical order by their European and/or North American names. These flags represent each region of Home. (China) = Asian Home; (Europe) = European Home; (Japan) = Japanese Home; (United States) = North American Home

Name of Space	Game	Features	Developer	Full Game Launching Support	Release
Abstergo Lab	Assassin's Creed II	*Security Terminal - Enter Code; successfully enter code to gain access to the "Assassin's Hideout"; *Abstergo Animus Table - Concept Art viewer *Vendetta - mini-game *Eagle Vision - Enables view to find six glyphs around the space (needed for the Security Terminal); *Door - Goes to "Assassin's Hideout" (after successful code entry at the Security Terminal) -Assassin's Hideout -*Concept Art Wall - Concept Art viewer -*Blog - Welcome blog and Developer blogs -*Assassin's Animus 2.0 - View People (Society, Contacts, and Targets) and Locations (Florence, Tuscany, Venice, Rome, and Romagna)	Ubisoft	No	(Europe) (United States) March 25, 2010
PS Vita Lounge	None		Sony Computer Entertainment		
nDreams: Aurora 1.9	Aurora	*Aurora is a unique game world full of challenges and secrets to uncover that will evolve over time with new features, characters, games, and narrative *OrbRunner - Users can gain XP and unlock special rewards by defending the isles from enemies *Information Point - various spots with information about Aurora; *Collect-O-Rama - 12 tasks to complete in which upon completion, nDreams will grant the user the "Collect-O-Rama Pack"; *Teller of Tales - 1. Concerning Aurora; 2. Deep Sky Fishing; *Aurora Defense Preview - preview of Aurora Defense; *Sky Fishing - mini-game *Manhole to "Xi Museum"; *Various shops for nDreams content	nDreams	Yes	(Europe) (United States) March 17, 2011
(China); Burn Zombie Burn Lobby (Europe) (United States); DoubleSix Lobby	Burn Zombie Burn	*The Maze - A zombie infested maze mini-game with rewards (D6 T-shirt 1); *Shop - Burn Zombie Burn T-shirts; *In-lounge zombies that walk around *Video screen advertising Burn Zombie Burn; *Poster; *Seating for the avatars *A Jail - If users try to glitch in this space, they will be sent here	Doublesix	No	(China) (Europe) (United States) July 30, 2009
BUZZ!: HQ	Buzz!	*Enter BUZZ!: Studio - Takes users to "BUZZ!: Studio" where the 64 Player Buzz! Quizzing is at with rewards (Single Win T-shirt, 25 T-shirt, and 100 T-shirt); *Quizzes used for BUZZ!: Studio are PSN user submitted quizzes at MyBuzz! website *VIP-like lounge *Seating for avatars	Relentless Software	Yes	(Europe) (United States) July 16, 2009; originally June 4, 2009
Cogs Sky Platform	Cogs	*Play Cogs - a 3D version of Lazy 8 Studios award-winning steampunk puzzle game *Play Cogs Demo - A demo version of the full game that's accessed in The Hub (North America) or the Boardwalk (Europe); *Multiplayer coming soon	Lazy 8 Studios	Yes	(Europe) (United States) November 3, 2011
Dead Nation Safe House	Dead Nation	*Zombie Shooter mini-game	Housemarque	No	(Europe) (United States) February 3, 2011
Evil Academy Lounge	(China) (Japan); Makai Senki Disgaea 3 (Europe) (United States); Disgaea 3: Absence of Justice	*Usable Prinny Series: Giant Type (not for sale) - Display of a purchasable one *Read memo left at the "RosenQueen Co." Weapon Shop. *Shop - Clothes and ornaments from Makai Senki Disgaea 3; *Read the memo left in the "Sickroom". *Read memo left at the "RosenQueen Co." General Store. *Questionnaire Corner - Rewards four T-shirts (two for male and two for female); *Students Wanted! - Poster; *Disgaea Test - A, B, or C answer game *Video screen - Advertising Makai Senki Disgaea 3; *Move to "Mao's Lab" - Door	Nippon Ichi Software	No	(Japan) April 23, 2009 (China) July 2, 2009 (United States) June 10, 2010
Mao's Lab	(China) (Japan); Makai Senki Disgaea 3 (Europe) (United States); Disgaea 3: Absence of Justice	*Netherworld Millionaire - Card game *How to Play "Netherworld Millionaire"; *Arcade Game - Mini-game; *Somebody's face is pasted on the sandbag *Peek at Mao's diary. *Move to "Evil Academy Lounge" - Door	Nippon Ichi Software	No	(Japan) April 23, 2009 (China) July 2, 2009 (United States) June 10, 2010
DISGAEA 4 Lounge	(China) (Japan); Makai Senki Disgaea 4 (Europe) (United States); Disgaea 4: A Promise Unforgotten	*How to Play "Netherworld Millionaire"; *Hell Sevens - mini-game *Arcade Game - mini-game *Prize Exchange - exchange points for prizes *How to Play Prinny Race; *Ticket sales *Disgaea Test - mini-game *Commerce Point; *Video screens	Nippon Ichi Software	No	(Japan) 2011 (United States) January 18, 2012
Dragon's Green	Dragon's Green	*Dragon's Green - Nine holes of fantasy mini-golf with four difficulty gauntlets *Dragon's Green Leaderboard - Leaderboard	Sony Computer Entertainment	Yes	Worldwide: September 16, 2010
The Event Horizon Lounge	Dust 514	*Users talk to the bartender to get directed to the Recruiter (helps give users a beta code for Dust 514); *Slay — a tabletop style mini-game of world domination *Special rewards	CCP Games	No	(United States) June 13, 2012
Dynasty Warriors Online Gallery	(China) (Japan); Shin SangokuMusou Online (Europe) (United States); Dynasty Warriors Online	*Dragon statue in middle of square *Fountain; *Corridors surrounding the garden *Video screen advertising the game	Koei	No	(Japan) February 11, 2010
Far Cry 2: Reuben's Office	Far Cry 2	*One of the first five Game Spaces for the Home Open Beta (in North America); *Reuben's Report - mini-game *Reuben's Computer - mini-game *Interactive Map - mini-game *Dossiers; *Seating for avatars *Stairs to "Far Cry 2: Train Station"	Ubisoft	Yes	(United States) October 16, 2008 (Closed Beta); December 11, 2008 (Open Beta) (Europe) January 22, 2009
Far Cry 2: Train Station	Far Cry 2	*One of the first five Game Spaces for the Home Open Beta (in North America); *Mancala - mini-game *Newspaper Clipping; *Seating for avatars *Stairs to "Far Cry 2: Reuben's Office"	Ubisoft	Yes	(United States) October 16, 2008 (Closed Beta); December 11, 2008 (Open Beta) (Europe) January 22, 2009
Club Fight Night	Fight Night Round 4	*Expansion to the EA SPORTS Complex; *Club DJ - DJ style mini-game with a reward (Club DJ T-shirt); *Video screens *Seating for avatars *Coming Soon, Robot Boxing; *On November 25, 2009, Fight Night Round 4 producers Mike Mahar and Brian Hayes were in Home between the hours of 4:00 pm and 5:00 pm PT (7:00 pm and 8:00 pm EST), for a live chat with the PlayStation Home community.	EA Sports	No	(Europe) (United States) July 16, 2009 (Japan) October 9, 2009
(Europe); Everybody's Golf Space (Japan); Minna no Golf Lounge (China) (United States); Hot Shots Golf Lounge	(Europe); Everybody's Golf (Japan); Minna no Golf (China) (United States); Hot Shots Golf	*One of the first five Game Spaces for the Home Open Beta (in Japan); *Questionnaire (Asia, Japan, & North America)- survey that rewards a Grass Lawn Sofa; *A gift from Suzuki (Europe)- Gives users an EG Lawn Sofa; *Video screen *Poster; *To 'Everybody's Golf: World Tour' title screen or Start Hot Shots Golf: Out of Bounds - Lets users game launch *Seating for avatars	Clap Hanz	Yes	(Japan) December 11, 2008 (China) March 26, 2009 (Europe) June 18, 2009 (United States) October 1, 2009
Guitar Hero: Backstage	Guitar Hero	*Guitar Hero-Master of Rock - mini-game *Two video screens advertising Guitar Hero 5 and Guitar Hero: Van Halen; *Seating for avatars *Guitar Hero-VIP Access - Accesses the VIP Lounge -VIP Lounge - VIP lounge for Guitar Hero 5 -Users must register on the Guitar Hero 5 website to access the space -After entering the space, users receive a couple of Guitar Hero 5 themed items	Neversoft	No	(United States) March 26, 2009
Abandoned Docks of Empire City	inFAMOUS	*inFAMOUS Phone - Enter various numbers that are found in the space to hear different messages *Reaper Shock - mini-game where users can zap reapers with a global leader board and rewards (Medic shirt and pants, like Trish's from the game, and a Trash Monster Ornament) *inFAMOUS Graffiti - Users can create their own graffiti to display for their friends *inFAMOUS Blog - First space to broadcast exclusive media for a game, developed by Sucker Punch Productions; *Video screen advertising inFAMOUS; *Seating for avatars	Sucker Punch Productions	No	(China) (Europe) (United States) July 2, 2009
Journey	Journey	*Users wander the desert looking to unlock its secrets (similar to the actual PSN game)	thatgamecompany	No	(Europe) (United States) March 14, 2012
LittleBigPlanet PlayGround	LittleBigPlanet	*King's Snap Happy Photo Challenge - Mini-game where users take different photos that the king tells them to; three levels *LittleBigPlanet Store -"The Creator -Sub-space of the PlayGround -Users can create their own wallpapers for their PS3's XMB -LittleBigPlanet Dirby - A new space within the LittleBigPlanet PlayGround -LittleBigPlanet Dirby shooting mini-game	Media Molecule	Yes	Worldwide: May 13, 2010
MuiMui Ship	LocoRoco	*Information Board; *How to Play Domingo Race - Instructions; *Domingo Race Ticket Booth - Mini-game; *Binoculars - Lets users view the "LocoIsland" personal apartment *Pickory Exchange - Lets users trade in the pickories they have earned for items *MuiMui Shop - PSN Game Store for LocoRoco; *MuiMui Shop - Home virtual items store for LocoRoco	Japan Studio	No	(Japan) January 7, 2010 (China) (Europe) (United States) February 18, 2010
Main Hall	Magic: The Gathering – Duels of the Planeswalkers	*Displays of Mana (White, Blue, Black, Red, and Green), Serra Angel, Jace Beleren, Sphinx, Demon, Hydra, Chandra Nalaar, and The Knowledge Font; *Name That Card Game; *What Mana Color Are You? Game; *Spot the Difference Game; *Get Final T-shirt Reward - obtain all other T-shirts to access *Magic: The Gathering Store - Magic: The Gathering - Duels of the Planeswalkers content *Doors to the "Gallery"; The "Gallery" - Displays of Magic: The Gathering artwork -Displays of Kavu Aggressor, Veteran Cavalier, Eternal Dragon, Tidal Warrior, Serra Angel, Oathsworn Giant, Yawgmoth's Edict, Glade Gnarr, Centaur Veteran, Essence Scatter, Shook, Shiva Dragon, Alexi, Zephyr Mage, Avatar of Woe, Vampire Hounds, Unnatural Selection, Liege of the Pit, Ravanous Baloth, Undo, Kindled Fury, and Dragon -Fractured Statue Game -Fractured Picture Game -Art Fragments Game	Stainless Games	No	(Europe) (United States) February 10, 2011
Men In Black Headquarters	MIB: Alien Crisis	*MIB HQ Check-In - Users take a quiz to find out if they're an agent or an alien, if agent, they can enter the HQ; *MIB Headquarter - Central - Elevator taking users downstairs where users can access a shop for MIB content *Users can take photos with their favourite agents, and walk around the headquarters for rewards and sneak peeks from the new movie Men in Black 3 and the upcoming video game MIB: Alien Crisis	FunLabs	No	(Europe) May 2, 2012 (United States) May 16, 2012
ModNation Club	ModNation Racers	*Dance Floor; *Leaderboard - For Hot Seat, ModNation, and Skee Racing; *ModNation Racer's Website - Accesses website *Skee Racing - mini-game *MadNation Sticker Wall - Create designs *Tool Tips - Tips for Skee Racing	United Front Games	No	(Europe) (United States) May 27, 2010 (China) July 22, 2010
MotorStorm Sphere	MotorStorm: Pacific Rift	*Was only available for a limited time *Fully launched as the "MotorStorm Carrier" Game Space; *Europe only - When users first accessed the space, they received "MotorStorm Festival Jeans"; *MotorStorm Jukebox - Thirteen songs to choose from *Video screen advertising MotorStorm: Pacific Rift; *Seating for avatars	Evolution Studios	Yes	(Europe) (United States) August 13, 2009; Removed October 9, 2009
MotorStorm Carrier	MotorStorm: Pacific Rift	*MotorStorm Carrier Treasure Hunt - Mini-game involving the in-game avatars Fidget and Bones; *Arcade Game - Lunatic Launcher arcade game *MotorStorm Web Portal - Access internet *MotorStorm DJ Deck - Lets users select a track to play *MotorStorm Light Controls - Lets users control the lights on the dance floor *MotorStorm Smoke Machine - Lets users turn on or off the smoke machine for the dance floor *MotorStorm Merch Stall - Shop; *Video screen advertising MotorStorm: Arctic Edge; *Posters advertising MotorStorm; *Seating for avatars	Evolution Studios	Yes	(Europe) (United States) February 18, 2010 (Japan) April 29, 2010
NOL Lounge	Nobunaga no Yabou: Tendou	Lounge for Nobunaga no Yabou: Tendou; *Exclusive to Japan currently	KOEI	No	(Japan) 2010
Novus Prime	Novus Prime	*Free-to-play multi-player game for PlayStation Home; *Stop - Items for Novus Prime; *Spacewalk - Anti-gravity area for avatars *Join the Fight! - Space battle mini-game *VIP Area - Special access	Hellfire Games	Yes	(Europe) (United States) December 2, 2010
GINDAMA Humane Shopping Street	PachiPara DL Hyper Sea Story In Karibu	*Middle-aged woman in the okonomiyaki shop - in-lounge avatar *Radio; *Young man from the clothing shop - Shop; *Apologetic shopkeeper *Pachinko Machine - mini-game *Cheerful shopkeeper - purchase PachiPara DL Hyper Sea Story in Karibu; *Match Arranger Kanada - Game Match station *In-lounge avatars playing the Pachinko Machine - Gamble Shigela, Woman paying attention to the back, Kind-hearted woman, Laughing Man, Man playing pachinko, Happy woman, and Man talking in a low voice *Bus Stop - Go to "Irem Square", "Seaside of Memories", "Gathering Place for Spelunkers", "Sparkle in the Void of Space", "Field of Ge Kito", and Stay Here	Irem Software Engineering	No	(Japan) February 25, 2010 (China) April 20, 2010
Ratchet & Clank: Time Travelers	Ratchet & Clank Future: A Crack in Time	*Gadgetron HQ - Explore Ratchet & Clank's Action-Packed World; *Skunk Works' Multi-Player Shooter - Mini-game with rewards *Escaped Sheep - Mini-game with rewards *Grummelnet Superstore - Shop with Ratchet & Clank items including the "Ratchet & Clank: Home Sweet Home" personal space *Groovitron Testing; *Battle Throughout Time in the Firing Range - Past, Present, and Future with the Artillery Mini-Game in each *Ammo information of Inducer, Quack-O-Ray, Time Bomb, Meteor Gun, Liquid Nitrogen, Blitz Gun, Fusion Grenade, and Harbinger	Insomniac Games	No	(Europe) (United States) October 15, 2009 (China) (Japan) November 19, 2009
(China) (Japan) BIOHAZARD 5 Film Studio (Europe) (United States) RESIDENT EVIL 5 Studio Lot	(China) (Japan); Biohazard 5 (Europe) (United States); Resident Evil 5	*Five posters *Butcher's Shop; *Treasure Hunt "BSAA Training Mission" - mini-game that rewards four different beetles (Brown, Green, Gold, and Jeweled) depending on the time the user finds the beetle within the three-minute hunt *Adam's Shop -First in-lounge shop in Home, purchasable RE5/BH5 costumes for users avatars and ornaments for users personal spaces *Arcade game - Lets users game launch *"RE5/BH5 Archives", open to Asia, Japan & North America, reward is Albert Wesker's sunglasses, will be open soon to Europe, must own RE5/BH5 to access	Capcom	Yes	Worldwide: March 5, 2009
Resistance Station	Resistance 2	*Four Barrels of Fury - Turret style FPS mini-game with rewards(Resistance 2 T-shirt, a hat modeled after the flagship in Wave 4, and a Resistance 2 hoodie); *Video Screen advertising Resistance 2 for Asia and Japan and Resistance: Retribution for Europe and North America; *For a limited time in Europe, there was a poster where the video screen is that had a code in which the first 3,000 users that redeemed it received a Resistance: Retribution T-shirt; *Screen - Leader board for Four Barrels of Fury; *Seating for avatars	Insomniac Games	Yes	(China) (Europe) (United States) May 21, 2009 (Japan) September 10, 2009
Resistance Diner	Resistance 3	*Scavenger Hunt mini-game	Insomniac Games	No	(Europe) (United States) September 8, 2011
Sparkle in the Void of Space	R-Type Tactics II: Operation Bitter Chocolate	*First PSP title to receive a Game Space; *Space station *Display of three R-Type shooter ships *R-Type Shooter mini-game with rewards *Video screen advertising R-Type Tactics II: Operation Bitter Chocolate; *Shop selling related items *Bus Stop - Go to "Irem Square", "Seaside of Memories", "Gathering Place for Spelunkers", "Field of Ge Kito", "GINDAMA Humane Shopping Street" and Stay Here	Irem Software Engineering	No	(Japan) December 3, 2009 (China) February 25, 2010
The SingStar Rooms	SingStar	*Dance floor reacts to the shapes you throw and that the music will change according to what style on dance the majority of avatars are partaking in *SingStar Video Juke Box - Users can vote on songs *SingStar Music Quiz - Coming in a later update *Rewards - 5 different SingStar T-shirts *"The SingStar Rooms: VIP" -Used for special SingStar events -Was first available from September 24, 2009, to October 9, 2009, and featured an event for Dizzee Rascal, a Mercury Award Winner -VIP room reopened for Christmas from December 17, 2009, to January 14, 2010, with a new mini-game -Reopened for an event for the band Stereophonics on March 25, 2010	London Studio	No	(Europe) (United States) September 24, 2009
SIREN Lounge	(China) (Japan); Siren: New Translation (Europe) (United States); Siren: Blood Curse	*One of the first five Game Spaces for the Home Open Beta (in Japan); *Video screen *Wheel chair seat for avatars *At 12 am CT, a siren goes off, the space goes red and three shibitos come out from the woods for about three minutes *Ward of Despair - room with the mini-game Ward of Despair (three versions of it with different rewards; SIREN T-shirt, Doctor's outfit, Nurse's outfit, Miyako's outfit, and Alcove set), three screens, and seating for avatars	Japan Studio	No	(Japan) December 11, 2008 (China) March 26, 2009 (United States) May 7, 2009 (Europe) April 1, 2010
SOCOM: Opposing Force	SOCOM U.S. Navy SEALs: Confrontation	*First space to award an in-game item for use in the game the space is based upon *Golden AK-47 Assembly Assembly - Assemble an assault rifle in 12 seconds to win a Golden AK-47 for use in SOCOM: Confrontation; *5-Finger Fillet mini-game with leaderboards *Entrance to "SOCOM: Tactical Operations" space	Slant Six Games	No	(Europe) (United States) April 15, 2010
SOCOM: Tactical Operations Center	SOCOM U.S. Navy SEALs: Confrontation	*SOCOM Telestrator - Users can collaborate, strategize, and enhance their gameplay experience *TOC terminal - Users can learn about Crossroads, Urban Wasteland, Quarantine, Fallen, Kasbah, Desert Glory, and Frost Fire maps *SOCOM Leaderboard - Regional leaderboard for SOCOM: Confrontation; *Seating for avatars *Entrance to "SOCOM: Opposing Force" space	Slant Six Games	No	(United States) June 18, 2009 (Europe) July 2, 2009 (Japan) August 27, 2009
Sodium Hub	Sodium	*Home's first Massively multiplayer online game published by Lockwood Publishing; *VICKIE - Accesses Objectives, Resource Trading, Shop, Gift Friends, and Connect; *Commerce Point - Shop with items from the Sodium universe and items from Lockwood and Outso; *Portal to the "Salt Shooter Game" personal space (free upon first entry to the Sodium Hub) and public space *Scorpios - Bar- like area where users can be bartenders to earn points or customers to consume drinks *VIP Area - Special access area *Twitter Screens - Live Twitter feed from Lockwood; *Use - Vending machine with Vetoxade drink *Display of Salt Shooter Tank - Goes to "Salt Shooter Game" personal space *Teleport to "Sodium Training" -Sodium Training - Accesses [Salt Shooter] Tank Trainer (train for Salt Shooter Game), Commerce Point, and teleporter to the "Salt Shooter Game" and "Sodium 2"	Outso	Yes	(Europe) (United States) December 17, 2009 (Japan) June 17, 2010 (China) July 30, 2010
Salt Shooter - Public Game Space	Sodium One - Salt Shooter	*A public space version of the personal space, "Salt Shooter Game"; *Slightly modified from the personal space version *[SodiumOne] Salt Shooter Game - new rewards *Features displays of enemy units: Sand Skater, Skimmer Assault Drone, Scout Drone, Heavy LRM Drone, Light Assault Drone, Sand Stalker, and Advanced Scorpion Scout; *Portal to "Sodium Hub"; *Portal to "Sodium 2"; *Commerce Point	Outso	Yes	(Europe) (United States) October 6, 2011
Sodium 2	Sodium 2: Project Velocity	*[Sodium2] Project Velocity - Game where users race in their customized Velocity Racers *[Sodium2] Multiplayer - Users can race against other users of similar rank with their customized Velocity Racers; *Garage - Upgrade Velocity Racers with unlocked parts *Commerce Point - Shop with items from the Sodium universe and items from Lockwood and Outso; *Teleport to the Sodium Hub; *Teleport to the Salt Shooter Game (personal space for Sodium One)	Outso	Yes	(Europe) (United States) June 16, 2011
(China) (Japan); Gathering Place for Spelunkers (United States); Gathering Place for Cave Explorers	(China) (Japan); Minna de Spelunker (Europe) (United States); Spelunker HD	*Stone Monument - Credits of Developers; *Poster - Advertising the game *Bus Depot - Go to "Irem Square", "Seaside of Memories", "Sparkle in the Void of Space", "GINDAMA Humane Shopping Street" (Asia and Japan), "Fields of Ge Kito" (Asia and Japan), and Stay Here; *Shop - Irem related content *Stone Statue of the Wind & Rain - Game Matching station *Statue of the Moon & Sun - Game Matching station *Muttering Old Man - Murmurs in a foreign language *Clever-looking Boy - Gives a potion *Displays of Mysterious Ore, Fang of a Mighty Creature, Crystal Skull, Piece of Stone Slab, Ancient Book, Big Key, Cave Bat Guano, and Cave Snake Specimen	Irem Software Engineering	Yes	(Japan) March 19, 2009 (China) July 23, 2009 (United States) November 25, 2010
S.I.N.'s Secret Base from Street Fighter IV	Street Fighter IV	*Challenge Opponent - Shows your personal action by wearing full Street Fighter IV costumes *Ladder to climb up to center of room *Go up - Must qualify to play *Shop - Street Fighter IV costumes and items *Video screen advertising Street Fighter IV	Capcom	Yes	(Japan) July 30, 2009 (China) September 24, 2009 (Europe) October 9, 2009 (United States) October 23, 2009
Street Fighter X Tekken Total Game Integration	Street Fighter X Tekken	*Users can square off against friends and foes using their own avatars	Dimps/Capcom	No	(United States) July 25, 2012
Mishima Zaibatsu - Recreation Floor	Tekken 6	*Dumbbell Rack - Access for male and female rewards *Do you need something to drink? - Access for a reward *Arcade Game - Lets users game launch *Store - Free Kazuya costume *Video screen *Seating for the avatars *Door for Namco Bandai's developer space, the "Community Arena" (Asia & Japan) or "Namco Theatre" (North America) except in Europe	Namco Bandai Games	Yes	(United States) October 23, 2009 (China) (Japan) (Europe) October 29, 2009
The Godfather II	The Godfather II	*Five poker tables for "No Limit Texas Hold'em"; *Video screen advertising The Godfather II; *Seating for avatars *Users can see a pair of legs of a dead guy under one of the staircases	Visceral Games	No	(United States) April 9, 2009
Hot Zone	The Midway (series)	*Central hub for the Midways; *The Midway's Cash Carnival Sweepstakes - registration *Hot Streak Air Hockey - mini-game (six tables); *Redemption Center - redeem Hot Zone points *Speed Dial - coming soon *Ticket Booth - Purchase tickets and content from Mass Media; *Go to "Darla's Den"; *Go to The Midway; *Go to The Midway 2; *Go to The Midway 3	Mass Media Inc.	No	(Europe) (United States) May 16, 2012
The Midway	The Midway	*Meet Darla; *Ten mini-games: Darla's Darts, Spilt Milk, Frog Flinger, Trigger Happy, High Roller, Fickle Flapper of Fate, Bell Ringer, Ball Squeezer, Rebound, and Miz Fortune; *Go to "Darla's Den" - free personal space *Ticket Booth - Purchase tickets and content from Mass Media; *Go to The Midway 2; *Go to The Midway 3; *Go to "Hot Zone"	Mass Media Inc.	Yes	(Europe) (United States) July 1, 2010
The Midway 2	The Midway 2	*Ten mini-games: Wet and Wild, Kitty Cannon, Pop Goes the Weasel, Blue Balls, Swinger, Glue Factory, Bite Me, Teed Off, Half Cocked, and Miz Fortune; *Go to "Darla's Den" - free personal space *Ticket Booth - Purchase tickets and content from Mass Media; *Go to The Midway; *Go to The Midway 3; *Go to "Hot Zone	Mass Media Inc.	Yes	(Europe) (United States) December 9, 2010
The Midway 3	The Midway 3	*Ten mini-games: Light Me Up, Bit Foot, Puck It!, Scatter Shot, Dead Ringer, Pull My Finger, Beans Beans Beans, Whack Off, Penny Pincher, and Miz Fortune; *Go to "Darla's Den" - free personal space *Go to The Midway; *Go to The Midway 2; *Go to "Hot Zone"	Mass Media Inc.	Yes	(Europe) (United States) May 16, 2012
UFC Octagon	UFC Undisputed 3	*Mini-games - Trivia Takedown, Push-Ups, Sit-Ups, and Pull-Ups	THQ	No	(Europe) (United States) July 14, 2011
Uncharted: Sully's Bar	Uncharted: Drake's Fortune	*One of the first five Game Spaces for the Home Open Beta; *Mercenary Madness - arcade mini-game *Archives - room with Artifact Viewer, a video screen advertising Uncharted 2: Among Thieves, and seating *Artifact Room - room with seating *Smuggler's Den - room with Artifact Viewer and seating	Naughty Dog	No	(United States) October 11, 2008 (Closed Beta); December 11, 2008 (Open Beta) (Europe) November 5, 2009 (China) May 7, 2010
UNCHARTED 2 Nepalese Village	Uncharted 2: Among Thieves	*This space makes Uncharted the first game series to have a game space for both games in the series *Mask Mayhem - Mini-game where users find the pieces of the mask around the space and then try to assemble it for a reward *Torch Race - Mini-game; *Fortunate Thieves - Card-like mini-game with rewards; Jack Buser described it as an interactive, mini-Massively multiplayer online game *Uncharted 2 Blog - Lets users access the Uncharted 2 Blog; *Video screen advertising the game *Seating for the avatars	Naughty Dog	No	(Europe) (United States) October 23, 2009 (China) May 7, 2010
Fortune Hunter	Uncharted 3: Drake's Deception	*Limited time space for the Uncharted 3: Drake's Deception Total Game Integration; *A partial recreation of the Yemen level from the Uncharted 3 multiplayer *UNCHARTED 3: Fortune Hunter - third-person shooter mini-game with Home rewards; upon 100% completion grants an in-game bonus for Uncharted 3; *Pre-order - Users can pre-order Uncharted 3 from this space from Amazon.com and receive a "Nathan Drake" costume with gun firing action for their Home avatar (pre-order option also available from the mini-game's home screen); *To "Central Plaza/Home Square" - takes users to the Central Plaza (North America) or Home Square (Europe)	Naughty Dog	No	(Europe) (United States) October 13, 2011; Limited time
DOL Lounge	Uncharted Waters Online	*Lounge for Uncharted Waters Online; *Exclusive to Japanese Home currently	KOEI	No	(Japan) 2010
Warhawk Command Center	Warhawk	*Warhawk Sand Table - strategize attacks *Learning Terminal - eight in all for General Hints, Weapons, and Flying; *Holograms of two different Warhawks; *Eight Warhawk Posters	Incognito Entertainment/Santa Monica Studio	Yes	(United States) February 26, 2009; Removed July 1, 2010
DOKO DEMO ISSYO Lounge	Weekly Toro Station	Vending Machine - Shop; *980yen Canteen -Grants a reward *TORO's Apartment; *TORO Shop - Shop; *Let's Take a Commemorative Photo - Take a photo *Quack Springs; *Examine - Information; *Noodle Shop	Bexide/Sony Computer Entertainment Japan	No	(China) (Japan) August 6, 2010
Xi Museum formerly Xi Alumni Hub	Xi	*Xi Alumni Hub was removed on April 22, 2010, for updating *Relaunched on December 23, 2010, as the Xi Museum; *Xi Quiz - 5 question quiz about Xi; *Xi Museum Shop - Xi related items and items from nDreams; *Teleports for Alpha Zone 1 and 3 *"Alpha Zone 1 - Game Test Area" features the mini-game Hexoplis and also accesses the Maximum-Tilt Lobby and Adventure Lobby -*Hexoplis - race to beat 6 mini-games in 6 minutes (standard) or 5 minutes (expert) -*Maximum-Tilt Lobby - mini-game (called Maximum-Tilt) where users ride hover bikes to gain 25,000 points (standard and expert) -*Adventure Lobby - two text based mini-games: Cavern of the Bandit King (standard) and Corrupted (expert) *"Alpha Zone 3 - Entrance and Team Maze" features 4 mazes: Teamwork Maze, Ghost Maze, Riddle Maze, and The Expert Maze -*Teamwork Maze - users use teamwork to solve the maze -*Ghost Maze - users cannot touch the ghosts while solving the maze -*Riddle Maze - users solve riddles to solve the maze -*The Expert Maze - users use all previous rules to solve the maze *View Xi slideshow - slideshow of the 12 weeks of Xi; *View screen - Shows how Xi started with the clues and everything over the 12 weeks of Xi; *Door to go to "Home Square" (Europe) or "Central Plaza" (North America)	nDreams	No	(Europe) (United States) July 2, 2009; relaunched December 23, 2010

== Game Developer Spaces ==
This list is for all of the Game Developer Spaces that were released in the PlayStation Home Open Beta. Game Developer Spaces functioned similarly to Game Spaces except they were to promote the game developer themselves and several of their games instead of just one of their specific games. There were twelve Game Developer Spaces in Home from four game developers.

These flags represent each region of Home. (China) = Asian Home; (Europe) = European Home; (Japan) = Japanese Home; (United States) = North American Home

Developer	Name of Space	Features	Release
EA Sports	EA SPORTS Complex Green Poker Room	*Originally called the "EA SPORTS Complex Upstairs"; *Poker - Four green poker tables with rewards; no buy in requirement *Eight posters advertising EA Sports games *Two video screens *Seating for the avatars *Stairs that go to the "EA SPORTS Racing Complex"	(Europe) (United States) April 23, 2009 (Japan) October 9, 2009
EA Sports	EA SPORTS Complex Red Poker Room	*Poker - Four red poker tables and one black poker table with rewards; Buy in for red tables is 2,000 and for the black table is 10,000; *Eight posters advertising EA Sports games *Two video screens *Seating for the avatars *Stairs that go to the "EA SPORTS Golf Complex"	(Europe) (United States) July 2, 2009 (Japan) October 9, 2009
EA Sports	EA SPORTS Golf Complex	*Practice Range - Golf mini-game with rewards; two practice ranges total, one on each side of the Complex; *Three video screens *Seating for the avatars *Coming soon, a Golf Pro-Shop; *Stairs that go to the "EA SPORTS Complex Red Poker Room"; *Door that goes to "Club Fight Night"	(Europe) (United States) July 2, 2009 (Japan) October 9, 2009
EA Sports	EA SPORTS Racing Complex	*Originally called the "EA SPORTS Complex"; *Racing - Racing mini-game with a reward; eight cars total, four on each side of the Complex; *Three video screens *EA SPORTS Pro Shop - Fight Night Round 4 virtual items *Seating for the avatars *Stairs that go to the "EA SPORTS Complex Green Poker Room"; *Door that goes to "Club Fight Night"	(Europe) (United States) April 23, 2009 (Japan) October 9, 2009
GAME	GAME Moonbase	*GAME Store - Shop; *GAME Moonbase Shop - Purchase games from GAME; *Lunar Leap - mini-game *Lunar Dual - two player mini-game	(Europe) March 18, 2010
Granzella Inc.	Great Edo of Nippon	*Goldfish Scooper Ginji - mini-game *Shooting Gallery - mini-game *Straw Bundle for practice - mini-game *Go around - to get in hot tub *Draper Store Minder Sakichi - store *In-lounge avatars - Stylish Kanbei, Rumor-loving Oyuki, Fruit Seller Mokichi, Sushi Seller Yohei, Tempura Seller Otoyo, Barley Tea Seller Okiku, Blow Dart Tokubei, Time Turner Old Woman, Moocher Tora Kichi, Stern Samurai Gonzaemon, Bath-averse Okusa, and Hurried Express Messenger Jinbei; *Spirit Hunting Mission - Individual Battle One, Two, and Three; *Spirit Hunting Mission - Group Battle One, Two, and Three; *NO THOROUGHFARE Sign - three "under construction" signs	(United States) January 5, 2012 (Europe) January 18, 2012
Granzella Inc.	Southern Island Hideaway	*Jet Ski racing mini-game *Ocean Floor Treasure Hunt mini-game *Shop for items from Granzella	(Europe) (United States) September 22, 2011
Hudson Entertainment	Hudson Gate	*Dolphy Race - Lets users race dolphins or vote on a dolphin to win a race (users must purchase the Dolphy Race personal space in order to race a dolphin); *To Waterfall Disk - Takes users to the Waterfall Disk; *Hudson Theater - Takes users to the "Hudson Theater" where they can view videos of Hudson games *To Large Monitor - Takes users to the large monitor *Bomber Dome - Takes users to the "Bomber Dome" where they can play a Bomberman-style mini-game *To Shop Disk - Takes users to the Shop Disk to access the shop to purchase content	(China) (Europe) (Japan) September 2, 2010 (United States) September 9, 2010
Irem	Irem Square	*Was redecorated for the New Year (2010) from January 7, 2010, to January 14, 2010, in Japan; to January 21, 2010, in Asia; *Was Redecorated from December 17, 2009, to January 7, 2010, for the holiday season *Based on the Japanese traditional festival *Message board - Details lounge events and new night stalls *Vendors - Nine in all (eight in North America currently) with free stuff or a mini-game with rewards *The nine Night Stalls are the Neighborhood Association Chairman, the Cheerful Balloon Vendor, the Okonomiyaki Vendor, the Cotton Candy Vendor, the Taiyaki Vendor, the Droll Mask Vendor, the Man Selling Shady Goods, and the Goldfish Scooping Game (Currently only Asia and Japan); *Japanese Confectionery Vendor - Shop with items from Irem; *Yagura - A large watchtower in the center of the space with a video screen at the top of it *Seating for the avatars *Bus Stop - Go to "Seaside of Memories", "Gathering Place for Spelunkers", "Sparkle in the Void of Space" (Asia and Japan), "Field of Ge Kito" (Asia and Japan), "GINDAMA Humane Shopping Street" (Asia and Japan), and Stay Here	(Japan) February 26, 2009 (China) July 23, 2009 (United States) January 14, 2010 (Europe) June 3, 2010
Irem	Seaside of Memories	*Was redecorated for the New Year (2010) from January 7, 2010, to January 14, 2010, in Japan; to January 21, 2010, in Asia; *Was Redecorated from December 17, 2009, to January 7, 2010, for the holiday season *Beach resort with three accessible huts *Tropical Angel Shop - Swimsuit apparel for users avatars *First space to let users go in and under the water; if users stay too long under the water, they get reset back at the entrance of the space *Flashing Stars - Found under the water, each with different rewards for finding them *Seating for the avatars *Bus Stop - Go to "Irem Square", "Gathering Place for Spelunkers", "Sparkle in the Void of Space" (Asia and Japan), "Field of Ge Kito" (Asia and Japan), "GINDAMA Humane Shopping Street" (Asia and Japan), and Stay Here	(China) (Japan) August 13, 2009 (United States) March 4, 2010 (Europe) August 26, 2010
Konami	Konami Penthouse	Displays of Konami's games *Dance Floor - Dance competitions *Shop - Konami content	(United States) November 25, 2010
Lockwood Publishing	Showcase Lobby	*For limited time, can be accessed from "Caramel" in the Central Plaza; *Five limited time rewards	(Europe) (United States) September 22, 2011
Loot Interactive	Loot Space Station	A public space devoted to videos and special events.	(United States) April 7, 2011
LucasArts	The LucasArts Star Wars Cantina	*In celebration of the 30th Anniversary of Star Wars; *Video screen *LucasArts Store for Star Wars items *Video screen *Seating for avatars *A band and bartender from Star Wars Episode IV: A New Hope	(Europe) (United States) August 5, 2010
Namco Bandai Games	(China) (Japan); Game Arena (United States); Namco Arcade Center	*The first Game Developer Space for the Home Open Beta (in Japan); *Arcade machines of all of the Namco Museum collection that can be downloaded from the PlayStation Network Store (Users must have the collection downloaded in order to play the arcades of the games at this space); *Money Exhchange Machine - Has a reward *Vending Machine - Has a reward *Love Seat - Users can test their compatibility and get one of three rewards *The Idolmaster SP Wandering Star, Perfect Sun, & Missing Moon Vending Machines - Users can play roulette to get rewards (350mm or 500mm soda cans and part of Haruka Amami's costume at each); *Video screen *Seating for the avatars *Door for the "Community Arena" (Asia & Japan), or "Namco Theatre" (North America)	(Japan) December 11, 2008 (China) March 26, 2009 (United States) July 16, 2009
Namco Bandai Games	(China) (Japan); Community Arena (United States); Namco Theatre	*The first Game Developer Space for the Home Open Beta (in Japan); *The Idolmaster SP 961 Production Vending Machine - Users can play roulette to get rewards (350mm or 500mm soda cans and part of Haruka Amami's costume); *Displays of Soulcalibur IV, Ridge Racer 7, and Tekken 6; *Video screens behind each advertising each of those games *Seating for the avatars	(Japan) December 11, 2008 (China) March 26, 2009 (United States) July 16, 2009
Studio Liverpool	WipEout Museum	*WipEout Team Logo Hunt - Search for 12 lights around the space to reveal the team logos *Arcade Game - WipEout arcade game *WipEout DJ Deck - 27 different tracks to play *WipEout Web Portal - Accesses website	(United States) July 8, 2010
Q-Games	(Japan); PixelJunk Museum (United States); PixelJunk Exhibition	*Features the games PixelJunk Eden, PixelJunk Monsters, and PixelJunk Racers; *For PixelJunk Eden, there are glass art displays of Pana, Phona, and Okali; *For PixelJunk Monsters, there are displays of the Giant, Fire Tower, Mortar Tower, and Trap Tower; *For PixelJunk Racers, there are displays of Silver Monkey mkll and Fireball V-series racers *A PixelJunk Game Shop with PixelJunk items *Video screen advertising the games *Seating for the avatars *From September 24 – October 9, 2009, Japan's featured a virtual recreation of Q-Games TGS 2009 Booth called the "Q-Games virtual public TGS Booth"; *The TGS Booth featured a video screen and a free shirt *"PixelJunk Shooter Mother Ship Hangar" -Exhibition for PixelJunk Shooter accessed through the door behind the shop -Opened on December 17, 2009, for North America and January 14, 2010, for Japan	(Japan) September 24, 2009 (United States) October 9, 2009 (Europe) February 4, 2010 (China) March 25, 2010

== Non-gaming Company Spaces ==
This list is for all of the Non-gaming Company Spaces that were released in the PlayStation Home Open Beta. Non-gaming Company Spaces also functioned similarly to Game Spaces, however, these were to promote the company and its products. They may also have included mini-games that relate to the company. There were six Non-gaming Company Spaces in Home.

These flags represent each region of Home. (China) = Asian Home; (Europe) = European Home; (Japan) = Japanese Home; (United States) = North American Home

Non-gaming Company	Name of Space	Features	Release
Audi	Audi Home Terminal	*First carmaker to develop a space for Home; *Features an Audi TV Channel delivering video content *More content to come in 2010; *Audi Polo shirt for entering the space *Audi Internet; *Teleport to "Audi Vertical Run"; *A1 Windows Game - new mini-game added on March 25, 2010; *Audi Presentations by the virtual host, Ralf	(Europe) December 17, 2009
Audi	Audi Vertical Run	*Vertical Run - Mini-game which is a futuristic mini-game featuring Audi's e-tron concept *The fastest players will earn their own Audi personal apartment in the center of the space *Teleport to "Audi Home Terminal"	(Europe) December 17, 2009
Diesel	Diesel Island	*A tropical beach for users to socialize *Commerce point - Accesses Diesel's store	(United States) December 15, 2011
Ford	The Ford Showroom	*Quests - Three quests to complete for Ford rewards; Turn-by-Turn Quest, Music Quest, and Phone Quest; *Ford Rep - In-lounge avatar. Categories: Talk about the quests, Learn more about SYNC, and Goodbye! *View Interior - Users must talk to the Ford Rep first to access. Users can view the interiors of the Ford Fiesta and Ford Edge cars. This is where users access the quests.	(United States) June 16, 2011
Fuji Television	LIAR GAME Lounge	*Based on Liar Game manga TV series *Playground area *Bar area *Stained glass windows area	(Japan) February 11, 2010
The Coca-Cola Company	Georgia Break Station	*This space was accessed by the Coca-Cola vending machine in Japan's Home Square; *This space was to promote Coca-Cola's series of Georgia branded coffee *The lounge was set up like a coffee shop with chairs and tables for users to sit at and chat *There were two in-lounge avatars that spoke about the coffee and there were exclusive virtual items from this space	(Japan) September 7, 2009; removed December 17, 2009
Red Bull	Red Bull Air Race	*The first Non-gaming Company Space for the Home Open Beta; *The Red Bull Air Race - Mini-game based on the real world event with two leader boards that are reset daily; one for the user's friends and the other for all of the users in Home. Users have three planes to choose from.	(Europe) (United States) January 8, 2009 (China) June 17, 2010
Red Bull	Red Bull Beach	*The Red Bull Flugtag - Mini-game based on the real world event with a leader board. Users have five flying machines to choose from *Red Bull Jukebox - Ten tunes from Red Bull; *Video Screen - Advertising Red Bull Illume; *Boardwalk - Takes users to "Red Bull Illume"	(Europe) (United States) November 26, 2009 (China) June 17, 2010
Red Bull	Red Bull Illume	*The Red Bull Illume - An exhibition of action and adventure sports photographs from Red Bull Illume. The winning photograph from each of the competition's ten categories is displayed on large illuminate cubes, imitating the real-life exhibit *Video screen - Advertising Red Bull Illume; *Helicopter - Takes users to "Red Bull Air Race"; *Boardwalk - Takes users to "Red Bull Beach"	(Europe) (United States) November 26, 2009 (China) June 17, 2010
Sony	FevaArena Entrance	*"FevaArena Global Pitch Area" - Released worldwide on June 10, 2010; the first global public space in the Home Open Beta allowing users from Asia, Europe, Japan, and North America to converge in one space to participate in events, mini-games, and to celebrate the 2010 FIFA World Cup; *A lounge for the 2010 FIFA World Cup supported by Sony; *An area for events *An area for presentations *A cafe-like area on the second floor *A quiz on Sony Football; *Shop; *African related designs due to the 2010 FIFA World Cup being in South Africa; *FevaArena Photo Spot - Take pictures of avatar against a FIFA backdrop *FevaArena Pitch lounge was added on March 18, 2010, in Japan - A virtual stadium of the FIFA arena with a mini-game	(Japan) December 3, 2009 (China) (Europe) (United States) June 3, 2010; Removed August 2010

== See also ==
- PlayStation Home
