= Bryan Niven =

American artist and photographer (born 1979)

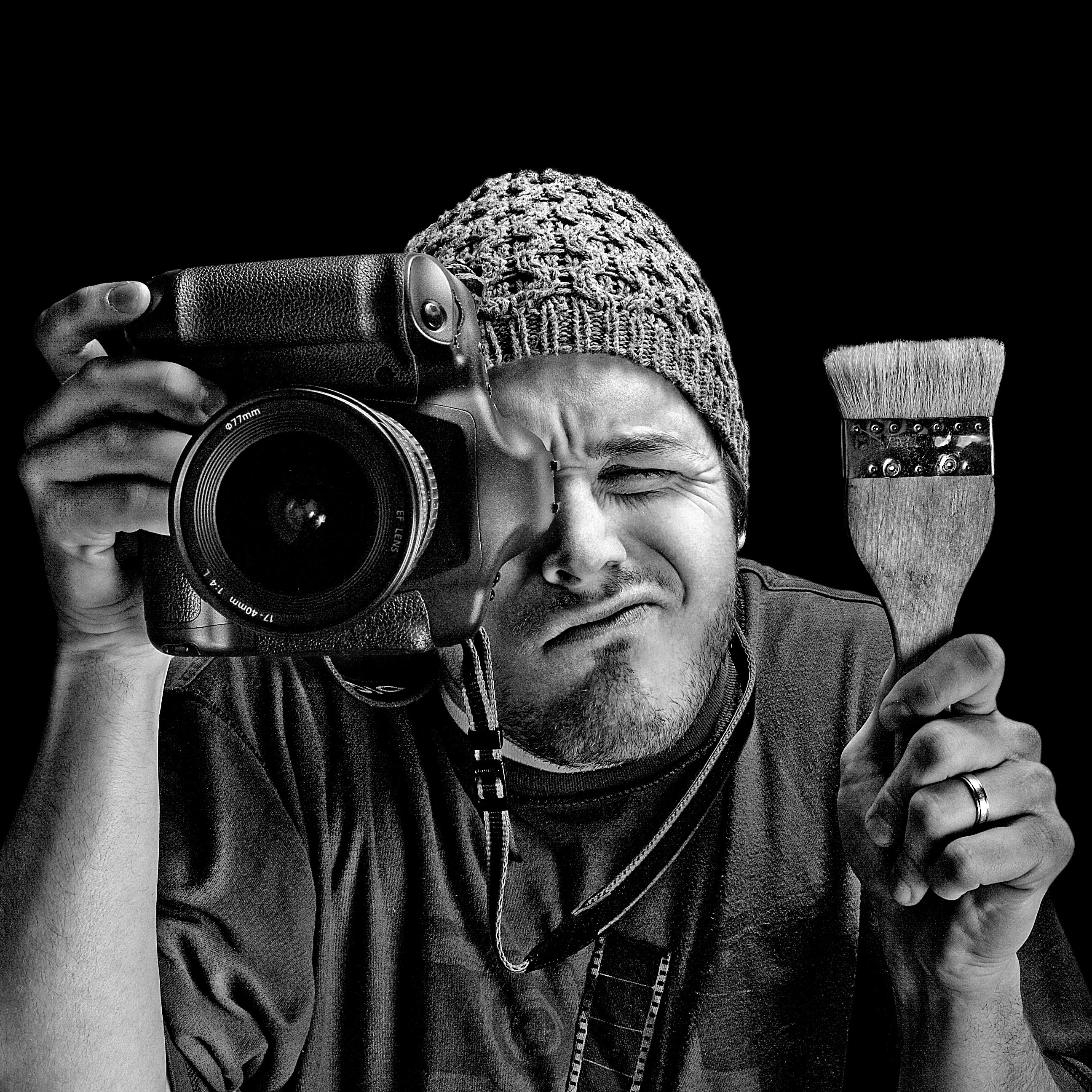
- This image was used by Apple to promote one of Niven's lectures at the SoHo Apple Store, in NYC.
- Born: April 21, 1979; Provo, Utah, U.S.
- Occupations: Photographer and Digital Artist
- Children: 3
- Website: http://www.bryanniven.com

Bryan Robert Niven (born April 21, 1979) is an American artist and photographer, known for his surrealistic and color-saturated images displaying families and individuals in a caricaturistic style. Niven is also known in the surf industry, and on social media, for his unique and extreme bodysurfing images, and videos. Niven currently resides in Pismo Beach, California with his wife and three children.

== Career ==
Apple has involved Niven in various projects including presentations at the Apple Store in Soho, New York, and as a contributing author for "Apple Pro" on apple.com. International exposure followed Niven after he photographed Rancid drummer Branden Steineckert in 2007. Niven's image of Steineckert debuted a few months later during a presentation of Aperture that Niven gave for Apple, in New York City. Further International exposure came after Niven's work was featured in a four page article "The American Dream in Technicolour", in the UK based magazine, Digital Photographer.

Adobe has also worked with Niven, licensing some of his images for use with their on-going Pop-Up Stores, detailed on Adobe's Blog, involving their photo-editing software Adobe Photoshop. Other collaborations include companies such as CNET and their Gotham, Hands-On Holiday Guide, event in New York City. In 2009 Niven was showcased as a VIP photographer for Dynalite Inc., joining a list of well known, and well established photographers, (much his senior), such as Michael Grecco, Vincent Versace, Nick Vedros, Jack Reznicki, Joe DiMaggio, Nancy Brown, and Lynn Goldsmith. Dynalite has since featured Niven's work in well known photography magazines such as PDN, and Shutterbug. Dynalite uses Niven's work to advertise their lightweight studio lighting, "road series" and ring flash units. Niven's work has been used in national product-leaflets for Dynalite as well, in photography stores, including New York based B&H Photo Video.

After years of running his photography studio, Niven moved back to California, in 2017, to California’s Central Coast. Growing up surfing, Niven stumbled onto bodysurfing in Pismo Beach, and began filming and photographing his extreme first person waves, using a 360 camera from GoPro, called the GoPro MAX. Niven began posting footage to Instagram, and other social media outlets, gaining popularity, including sponsorships, such as Slyde Handboards. Niven is known for his positive attitude in the water, and is often vocal in his excitement, for both his own rides, and the waves of others, as well as his encouragement of others.

In late 2023 one of Niven’s photographs was selected by Red Bull, from around 50,000 entries, and featured on their official website, as a Red Bull Illume Photographer, for their international Red Bull Illume photography competition, hosted in Austria. His image, “Brightside” was selected as one of only 25 others in the, “Creative”, category. Niven’s image was also included in Red Bull’s limited edition book, featuring the semi-finalists, finalists, category winners, and over-all winner. Niven’s image was also featured on Red Bull’s illume website, and social media pages.

In 2024 Niven began talks with one of his bodysurfing sponsors in a bid to purchase the company, and planned to release a custom, signature model, bodysurfing handboard, featuring Niven’s own board design and artwork. However, Niven ultimately decided against the buyout, and instead began prototyping his own boards.

Niven manages several blogs and websites, consisting of commercial and personal blogs, web galleries, photography courses, and YouTube outlets featuring his behind-the-scenes-videos of his productions. Some of Niven's websites appear to have been earlier blogs and websites, which now direct followers to new addresses. According to a recent entry in one of Niven's own blogs he continues to stay busy with projects including another internationally reaching project, taking him to Jerusalem.

== Notable subjects ==
- Mo Rocca (comedian)
- Jeff Coffin (two-time Grammy-winning member of Bela Fleck and the Flecktones)
- Jordan Mendenhall (pro snowboarder)
- Dave Samuels (Grammy-winning member of the Caribbean Jazz Project)
- Branden Steineckert (current drummer for Rancid and founding member of The Used)
- Nick Rimando (pro soccer player)
