= Disgaea 4 =

2011 video game

- Developer: Nippon Ichi Software
- Publishers: JP: Nippon Ichi Software; WW: NIS America
- Director: Masahiro Yamamoto
- Producer: Sohei Niikawa
- Designer: Masahiro Yamamoto
- Artist: Takehito Harada
- Writers: Sohei Niikawa; Yamazi Machina
- Composer: Tenpei Sato
- Series: Disgaea
- Engine: PhyreEngine
- Platforms: PlayStation 3; PlayStation Vita; PlayStation 4; Nintendo Switch; Windows; Android; iOS
- Release: February 24, 2011: PlayStation 3; JP: February 24, 2011; NA: September 6, 2011; EU: November 4, 2011; AU: November 24, 2011; PlayStation Vita; JP: January 30, 2014; NA: August 12, 2014; EU: August 29, 2014; PlayStation 4, Nintendo Switch; NA: October 29, 2019; EU: October 29, 2019; JP: October 31, 2019; AU: November 5, 2019; Windows; WW: September 10, 2020; Android, iOS; WW: November 29, 2022
- Genre: Tactical role-playing
- Mode: Single-player

Disgaea 4: A Promise Unforgotten (Note: Japanese: 魔界戦記ディスガイア4, Hepburn: Makai Senki Disugaia Fō) is a 2011 tactical role-playing video game for the PlayStation 3 and the fourth in the Disgaea series by Nippon Ichi Software. The game tells the story of Valvatorez, a former tyrant leading a party to rebel against the president of the Netherworld. Originally released in February 2011 in Japan, the game was released in September that year in the U.S., with a European and Australian release in November. A western release of the Vita rendition of Disgaea 4, subtitled A Promise Revisited, was released in North America and Europe in August 2014. This version was released for iOS and Android in November 2022. A second rerelease titled Disgaea 4 Complete+ was released on PlayStation 4 and Nintendo Switch on October 29, 2019, and was released on PC through Steam and Microsoft Store on September 10, 2020. The game features voice-overs in Japanese and English, with texts also translated into French.

== Gameplay ==
Combat is carried out in a turn-based strategy fashion. Allies can be deployed into combat, each with their own special skills and "Evilities", additional abilities that are applied to every character. Enemies and allies may be picked up and thrown, just like previous Disgaea games. However, Disgaea 4 adds a new feature to its grabbing system, allowing any friendly character on the field to pick up another adjacent friendly character, and continuously pick up allies, in a tower fashion. When in the tower formation, the movement ranges of the stacked characters increase. The bottom character of the tower can also throw the tower ahead of him/her to further increase movement distance. Special abilities may be activated while in tower formation, such as specific team attacks and the ability to obtain items normally unreachable due to a wall.

Friendly monsters can Magichange into weapons wielded by humanoid characters. A new function has also been added called "Demon Fuse". With Demon Fuse, the player can join two monsters to form a giant version of the combined monsters, as well as increasing statistics. Demon Fused monsters can be Magichanged as well, and the result is a giant weapon, to correspond with the size of the Demon Fused monster.

Valvatorez owns a hub location known as "Hades". Here, equipment can be purchased or sold, specific functions can be carried out, the player can travel to other locations to advance the story, and such. Unlike previous Disgaea hub towns, Hades comes with the ability to be rearranged to the player's liking, as well as changing the appearance.

As the player progresses through the story, Valvatorez's amount of captured land will grow, and as such, more characters can be befriended. Various items can also be placed on the land panels, as well as characters. When an item is placed on a panel, it may affect the layout or gameplay when a battle is initiated on that panel. For instance, having a certain item on a panel allows captured enemies to be "Disciplined".

When an enemy is captured, when certain conditions are met, the player may "Discipline" the captured enemy. When an enemy is being disciplined, the player may force them to perform a variety of actions, such as "Slap With A Wad Of Bills". The player has a limited number of turns to perform actions on the target, and then the player may force the captive to give up their HL (money), force them to locate treasure for the player, recruit them as an ally, or simply let them go. If recruited as an ally, a disciplined enemy's job is renamed as "Ex-hostage".

Over the PlayStation Network, the player can build their own pirate ship, and place characters on it as they wish. By using this, the player can use their pirate ship to "invade" the custom worlds of other Disgaea 4 players, and challenge them. Other player's characters can be captured the same way as a normal enemy, and may be punished through the new "Discipline" system. Players may also initiate pirate ship to pirate ship battles, see the total accumulated stats of all Disgaea 4 players, create battle maps to upload, use, and share, and send a specific council member, called a Foreign Minister, to another player's game to affect Senate in their game.

== Story ==
=== Setting ===
The game takes place in a Netherworld, common in Disgaea titles, and similar to Disgaea 3: Absence of Justice, focuses itself on a specific theme. Nippon Ichi, apparently feeling that it had exhausted all the game systems a school setting can provide, made the story one of a more political nature. While aspects of Netherworld politics existed in previous games, it is the central focus of the story and the gameplay in Disgaea 4.

=== Plot ===
Disgaea 4 follows Valvatorez, a vampire who was once feared as a tyrant until he promised a woman 400 years ago that he would not drink blood until he could instill fear in her, and she died before he could do so. He now has a menial job in Hades, where the souls of dead humans are sent to be transformed into Prinnies, alongside his loyal servant, Fenrich. When the Corrupternment orders the mass extermination of all Prinnies, Valvatorez and Fenrich put a stop to it and, disgusted by the government's actions, Valvatorez plots a rebellion.

Valvatorez and Fenrich battle across the Netherworld to win the support of the masses, and along the way, they meet several allies; Fuka Kazamatsuri, a young human girl who died and technically became a Prinny, but kept her human body due to a lack of resources; Desco, a monster created on Earth to be the 'Final Weapon', who was deemed a failure and cast to Hades; Death Emizel, the Netherworld President's only son, who was betrayed and declared legally dead by the government; and Vulcanus, a thieving angel who bears a striking resemblance to Artina, the woman from 400 years in Valvatorez's past, but has an entirely different personality.

Finally, Valvatorez and his allies assault the Corrupternment with the help of the support they have gathered, and defeat Netherworld President Hugo. Shocked at his weakness, they discover that the 'fear energy', the power source of the demons, has run dry ever since humans became less superstitious and began fearing each other more than monsters and demons. Furthermore, they learn that this situation was engineered by a human named Judge Nemo, who now runs both Earth and the Netherworld from behind the scenes, and plots the destruction of both.

Valvatorez and his allies travel to Earth to stop Judge Nemo's plan of destroying Earth. First, they defeat Des X, the 'final version' of Desco and Fuka's original killer. Next, they go to the Moon, which Judge Nemo plans to crash-land onto Earth, and save Earth again with the help of Flonne (a cameo from the original game), who inadvertently reveals that Vulcanus is in fact Artina, reincarnated as an angel. Judge Nemo's plans are foiled, but his incredible malice triggers Fear the Great, a machine created by God in order to purge all life on Earth. It is revealed that Nemo desires revenge for the death of Artina, who saved him in the distant past, and he cannot realize she has become an angel due to his evil. The party travels into Fear the Great and defeats Judge Nemo, saving Earth once and for all. Judge Nemo's soul prepares to vanish entirely, but Valvatorez decides to have it sent to Hades so that Nemo can reincarnate as a Prinny and atone for his sins. Depending on certain criteria, such as the number of team attacks performed with specific characters, Valvatorez will share a final cut-scene with one of the major playable characters; by default, Artina's ending will play.

=== Additional content ===
In the post-game someone else takes over Fear the Great and starts changing the world, resulting in various people becoming president and the world changing to fit their wants and needs. These are:

- Axel, who becomes a big star
- Flonne, who gets the demons to spread love and peace
- Raspberyl, who gets the demons to do volunteer work
- Etna, who gets the main characters to become her servants and continuously praise her "nice body"
- Laharl, who tries to defeat Valvatorez to become the main character of the game.

After defeating them the culprit finally gains full control of Fear the Great and reveals herself to be Asagi, who wants her own game. They defeat her and she joins, putting an end to the post-game story. Other optional bosses are Prinny Kurtis, Pringer X (which does not join) and Zetta (in regular humanoid form), Zetta being the strongest regular (non-Land of Carnage) boss. Baal does make an appearance, however as DLC boss, (his soul having been used in the creation of Pringer X), but the strongest sword is his Baal Sword.

In the PlayStation 3's online social gaming platform PlayStation Home, a game space has been released for Disgaea 4 called the Disgaea 4 Lounge.

== Reception ==
Reception

Aggregate score
Aggregator	Score
Metacritic	PS3: 80/100; VITA: 82/100

Review scores
Publication	Score
1Up.com	B−
Famitsu	PS3: 33/40; VITA: 32/40
GamePro	4/5
GamesRadar+	8.0/10
GameTrailers	7.5/10
GameZone	9/10
IGN	8.5/10
ZTGameDomain	9.7/10
PlayStation LifeStyle.net	9/10
RPGamer	4.5/5

The game has received generally favorable reviews, with an aggregated score of 80/100 on Metacritic. IGN gave the game an 8.5 saying "Fans of the series will find exactly what they expect here -- and non-fans will find exactly what they fear ... This is probably the best Disgaea since the 2003 original'. GameZone gave it a score of 9/10, stating "Overall, Disgaea 4 is a blast, and easily cements Nippon Ichi’s legacy as the kings of the strategy RPG genre. " Famitsu awarded the game a total of 33/40, composed of a 9/8/8/8 score. The game sold 79,425 copies in its first week in Japan, putting it at fourth place.

== Legacy ==
An enhanced remake of Disgaea 4: A Promise Unforgotten named Disgaea 4 Return (魔界戦記ディスガイア4 Return, Makai Senki Disugaia 4 Ritān), was announced for the PlayStation Vita during NIS's 20th anniversary event (on the weekend of July 12–14, 2013) and it was released on January 30, 2014, for Japan. Also, NIS America released the Vita rendition of Disgaea 4, subtitled A Promise Revisited, in August 2014 for North America and Europe.
