= PachiPara DL Hyper Sea Story In Karibu =

2008 video game

PachiPara DL: Hyper Sea Story In Karibu
- Developer(s): Sanyo Bussan
- Publisher(s): Irem
- Engine: PhyreEngine
- Platform(s): PlayStation 3
- Release: PlayStation Network: JP: July 2, 2008
- Genre(s): Casino
- Mode(s): Single-player

PachiPara DL (DownLoad) Hyper Sea Story In Karibu (パチパラ DL（ダウンロード）ハイパー海INカリブ) is a downloadable game released on the Japanese PlayStation Store on July 2, 2008.

== Gameplay ==
PachiPara DL Hyper Sea Story In Karibu is a pachinko simulator based on Sanyo Bussan's PachiPara series. The game includes three game modes; Sea Mode, Adventure Mode and Pirates Mode.

A Game Space has been released for the game in the Japanese version of PlayStation Home on February 25, 2010.
