= Sodium (video game) =

- A screenshot from PlayStation Home overlooking the Sodium Hub.
- Developer: Outso
- Publishers: Lockwood Publishing, SCEA, SCEE
- Engine: PlayStation Home
- Platform: PlayStation Home via PlayStation 3
- Release: Sodium One: EU: December 17, 2009; NA: December 17, 2009; JP: June 17, 2010; Sodium 2: NA: June 16, 2011; EU: June 16, 2011
- Genre: MMO

Sodium was a massively multiplayer online game that was based in and exclusive to the PlayStation 3's online community-based social gaming network PlayStation Home. Sodium was a planned four-part series of games, only two of which were released by the time of Home's closure. It was developed by Outso, a company that developed spaces and content for Home, and it was published by Lockwood Publishing, who had published other content for Home. The first part, Sodium One, was released on December 17, 2009, to the European and North American versions of Home. It was later released in the Japanese and Asian versions on June 17, 2010, and July 29, 2010, respectively. The second part, Sodium 2: Project Velocity, was released on June 16, 2011, to the European and North American versions of Home.

Due to the nature of Home, the game continued to grow and expand as Home did. New games, virtual items, and community events were continually added until November 2014 when new content ceased to be published for Home, and Home closed on March 31, 2015.

== Sodium Hub ==
The Sodium Hub was the main Home space for Sodium. Here, users had different mini-games in which they could earn Sodium Credits. Sodium Credits could be used to redeem Sodium related content throughout the Sodium universe. The first thing users had to do was talk to VICKIE. VICKIE was the Sodium A.I. Information Android that tracked all of the users information such as completed Objectives. This was where users could find out what Objectives they needed to complete and redeem their Sodium Credits. Users needed to select "Connect" when accessing VICKIE for the first time and register with the unique twelve character code on the Sodium website in order to play the "Sodium One - Salt Shooter Game". The Objectives rewarded the Sodium Credits. Other Objectives, not on the initial list, could be unlocked through playing the mini-games. A couple of the initial Objectives from VICKIE unlocked Home reward items. For a time, the Sodium Hub could be accessed through a teleport located in North America's central hub space, the Central Plaza, or through the World Map. After which, it could only be accessed via the Navigator (formerly World Map) which was accessed through the users Menu Pad in both Europe and North America.

The Objectives were completed through mini-games including [Salt Shooter] Tank Training, Scorpion Stomp, Desert Quench, and the Salt Shooter Game. [Salt Shooter] Tank Training was a training mission of the full game where users could train and try to improve their rankings. Scorpion Stomp was a mini-game where users stomped robotic scorpions. There were three kinds of robotic scorpions: yellow, red, and blue. The yellow robotic scorpions were the easiest to stomp and were mid-sized. The red robotic scorpions, which were the largest scorpions, required special scorpion stomping shoes which could be purchased at the Commerce Point. The blue robotic scorpions were the smallest scorpions and required users to drink a special "Vetoxade" drink, which could be ordered from "Scorpio's" (a green drink in a plus-shaped glass with a Sodium-logo drink stirrer and a strawberry garnish) or bought with Sodium Credits from a vending machine in the Sodium Hub. Near this area was where users could find the Commerce Point as well as a display of a [Salt Shooter] tank. The other mini-game in the Sodium Hub was Desert Quench where users could act as a bartender or customer at "Scorpio's". As a bartender, users made the drink another user had ordered and earned credits. As a customer, users could order their own custom drink and play a quick-time event mini-game to drink their ordered drink and earn credits. Users could also access an area where there was a big screen for Sodium content, and if they purchased the pilot outfit, they could access the pilot's VIP lounge.

== SodiumOne ==
SodiumOne (abbreviated as S1) was a combination of a full tank shooting game, called "SodiumOne - Salt Shooter", and other associated mini-games that started somewhere in the Nevada desert. The first five levels of Salt Shooter were free. The full game of Salt Shooter was obtained by purchasing the "Sodium Pilot Outfit - Red Chili Edition" from the Commerce Point, which was a shop with associated Sodium products and other content from Outso and Lockwood Publishing. From December 17, 2009, to December 24, 2009, each day during that time period, 150 voucher codes granting access to the pilot outfit and Salt Shooter Game were sent out to random users who visited the Sodium Hub. SodiumOne was the beginning of a planned four-part series of games for Home.

=== Salt Shooter Game ===
A screenshot demonstrating gameplay of SodiumOne - Salt Shooter.

Across from Scorpio's there was a teleporter that teleported users to their very own "Salt Shooter Game" personal space for Home, or the "Salt Shooter - Public Game Space" (public space released on October 6, 2011). Here is where users accessed the Salt Shooter Game, and there was also a Commerce Point as well and a teleporter back to the Sodium Hub. The Public Game Space also featured new rewards and displays of enemy units: Sand Skater, Skimmer Assault Drone, Scout Drone, Heavy LRM Drone, Light Assault Drone, Sand Stalker, and Advanced Scorpion Scout.

The [SodiumOne] - Salt Shooter Game was the full version of the [Salt Shooter] Tank Trainer that was in the Sodium Hub, however, without purchasing the pilot jacket, users could only access the first five levels. The Salt Shooter Hovertank was upgradeable with different weapons, thrusters, afterburners, and other upgrades. The upgrades were obtained through destroying enemy tanks in each level with a boss at the end. Users could also unlock up to five upgraded versions of the initial purchasable pilot jacket throughout the Salt Shooter Game to show how experienced they were in the game.

The objective of Salt Shooter was to destroy all enemy tanks and collect any items that the tanks dropped when destroyed. Some of the items were upgrades for the Salt Shooter Hovertank while other items, such as Silicon, Silver, and Gold, could be traded in with VICKIE for Sodium Credits with Gold giving the most Sodium Credits, then Silver, and then Silicon. Each level featured a sort of boss. Some of the levels' bosses may just have been a fleet of tanks, while other levels' bosses were shielded structures that need to be destroyed in addition to fighting off fleets of tanks. One of the unique things about Salt Shooter was that users could replay previous levels with all of their upgraded parts to their Salt Shooter Tank.

== Sodium2 ==
Sodium2 - Project Velocity (commonly referred to as simply Sodium2) was the first (and only) sequel to Sodium One and was first teased in an interview that occurred on December 18, 2009, with the CEO of Outso Halli Bjornsson, the Chief of Operations of Outso Joel Kemp, and the Director of Home for SCEA Jack Buser. Joel Kemp also mentioned that they would be releasing apartments for Home.

Sodium2 was officially unveiled by Jack Buser, Director of Home for SCEA, on PlayStation.Blog on December 10, 2010. According to Outso, "Sodium2 was looking to expand on every area of the original game with heavily customizable jet racers, supersonic speeds and a pounding soundtrack." The Sodium2 beta was tested by select members of the PlayStation Home community.

Sodium2 - Project Velocity was a completely free to play (unlike Sodium One) high-speed extreme racing game, which was not only visually similar to WipEout, but also featured music by CoLD SToRAGE, a regular contributor to the WipEout series. Sodium2 featured a single player mode that allowed users to hone their skills and progress through the Sodium2 XP system. Users could build XP, complete objectives, earn Sodium Credits, or compete on the world-wide leader board. In addition to single player, Sodium2 featured real-time multiplayer, the first time in PlayStation Home, where users could race against friends or strangers through a selection of courses.

The jet racers, or Velocity Racers, could be upgraded through the Sodium2 Garage. Users could upgrade their craft, equip explosive rocket-boosters, and choose different paint schemes. Users could purchase upgrades both with Sodium Credits earned in game, and through purchases from the PlayStation Store. Users could upgrade their crafts engine, afterburner, aero foils, flight computer, rocket boosters, paint schemes, and air brakes. At the end of each race, users were awarded Sodium Credits and XP for completing a variety of in-race challenges. As players gained XP, they achieved new experience levels which unlocked a variety of upgrades that were previously locked to them. Once they achieved new levels, users were able to purchase and equip the upgrades to their Velocity Racers to enjoy faster speeds and better handling. There was also a class system in multiplayer. Each upgrade item was assigned a class ranking of 1 to 5 stars and when a lobby was created, it was assigned a star value. A player with a 4-star item equipped could not join a 3-star lobby, likewise a 1-star racer could not join a 2-star lobby. They had to either adjust their Racer to level the playing field or play against same leveled users.

Sodium2 could be accessed from the Sodium Hub and the Navigator. For a limited time, it could be accessed at a special teleport in the former Central Plaza.
