= Handplane (bodysurfing) =

Bodysurfing technique

A handplane or handboard is used by bodysurfers to enhance their speed, lift and control whilst riding a wave.

A handplane is generally worn on a bodysurfer's leading hand.

== Materials ==
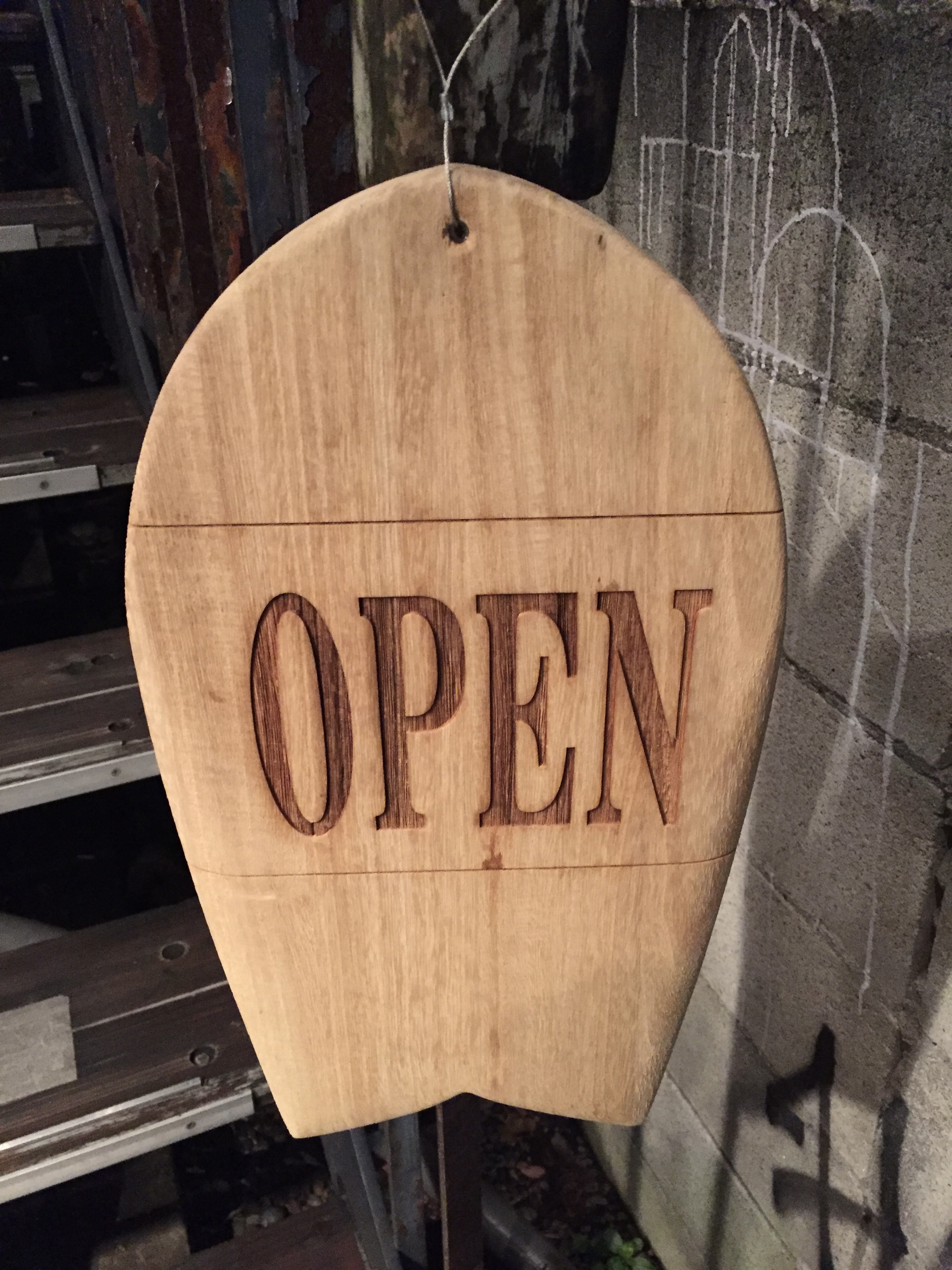
Wooden handplane displayed at the store's entrance. (Patagonia Surf Tokyo store, as of December 2015)

=== Wood ===
Handplanes have traditionally been made out of wood. To preserve the handplanes' lifetime, a number of manufacturers tend to prefer Paulownia or White Cedar.

=== Fiberglass ===
A number of handplane makers upcycle old broken surfboards to create handplanes out of foam with a fiberglass coating. Foam handplanes tend to have more buoyancy than ones made of wood or plastic.

=== Plastic ===
Plastic offers durability in the event of a dropped handplane or hitting rocks on entry/exit of a reef break. Some companies are now making handplanes from recycled ocean plastics.

== History ==
Bodysurfers would use any item with a flat surface, such as fast food trays, clipboards, or flip flops, to aid their ride. The first modern handboard, The Hand Surfa hardboard, was produced by an Australian company in the 1960s. In the 1990s, many new handboard manufacturers entered the market including Slyde Handboards, who created handboards from foam. and WAW Handplanes, who create handplanes from recycled plastics.
