= NG-Gamer =

Video game website

- Website type: Gaming
- Owner: Daan de Jong
- Creator: Christian de Jong
- Website: http://www.ng-gamer.nl/
- Registration: Free
- Launched: 2005
- Current status: Offline since 2014

Next Generation Gamer, commonly abbreviated as NG-Gamer, is one of the largest gaming websites in the Benelux. It can be accessed via the extensions .eu, .be or .nl, though the latter is the main extension. NG-Gamer is fed entirely by volunteered work by its editors.

== History ==
The domain for NG-Gamer was reserved back in 2004, though the actual site was founded in 2005, by Christian de Jong and Raoul Wolff. Before the website had even been firmly created, they started a search for people with interests and the needed capacities to supply a website with news and articles. After a search of several months, a crew was assembled.

NG-Gamer officially went online in November 2005. The launch of the website went as planned. Though during the course of the first several months online, several members of the crew left the team. However, NG-Gamer acquired several new crewmembers to compensate the loss. These crewmembers have supplied the website with a steady amount of newsposts, articles, screenshots, video's and more, making NG-Gamer what it is today.

=== NG-Gamer as a source ===
NG-Gamer gained some international fame due to its lengthy interview with Randy Pitchford about Brothers in Arms: Hell's Highway, an interview that was spread out over three articles. Other interviews such as the interview with Miroslaw Dymek, Technical Director of Reality Pump Studios about Two Worlds also gained fame. Though these two are not the only contributions of NG-Gamer that were used as sources or references by other media.

NG-Gamer's Martijn Müller was also the first source to mention Sony's release of PlayStation Home. Details were later given by Kotaku with NG-Gamer to finally confirm the rumors. This reporter was also the first source, in 2007, to report on Electronic Arts' interest in a remake or sequel of American McGee's Alice, which was officially announced in 2009. In January 2010, NG-Gamer was the first to confirm the development of Killzone 3, 2 months before it was first officially confirmed.

In the Dutch community, NG-Gamer was one of the few outlets to be given a number of multiplayer beta codes to Halo 3.

=== The future of NG-Gamer ===
Though nobody has an actual working crystal ball to foresee the future, intentions are to implements several new functions. Amongst these are:

- A full members list.
- The ability to post comments to video's.
- An update of the forums.
- Different colors for the menu's depending on the gaming system that is being viewed.
- A rework of the reputation system.
- Addition of cheats, walkthroughs, etc.

== NG-Gamer content ==
=== Screenshots and videos ===
Screenshots have been a part of the NG-Gamer database ever since the beginning. Video's however were introduced in May 2007. Video's from GameTrailers, iFilm and YouTube can now be seen at their corresponding gamepage. The latest video's appear on the front page and can be accessed there.

=== Articles ===
NG-Gamer is supplied by several kind of articles. These vary from columns to previews to reviews. Columns are always somewhat related to gaming, but are biased opinions of the writers. Previews and reviews however always handle a single subject, whether it's a videogame or a piece of hardware. The authors try to remain as neutral as possible whilst analyzing the subject, though a review is always just another opinion. The articles themselves can be accessed via the appropriate gamepage, though the latest articles appear on the front page with a spotlight and superlight.

Not all articles are written by the crewmembers themselves. A system has been implanted to allow users to post their own articles, for which they are awarded full credit. With the allowance of HTML tags, these articles can be supported with pictures to brighten them up and make them more attractive.

=== Reputation system and the community ===
Unlike most communities, NG-Gamer members do not gain fame by posting a lot. Instead they start with a reputation score of 10. Their reactions to newspost, articles, etc. get a score from zero to three, with three being highest. The more good scores you have, the higher your reputation gets, or vice versa. The lowest reputation score is zero whilst thirty is the highest. User's reputation score can be seen next to their username.

The reputation system is also connected to a filter. Users have the ability to filter out responses of other members by selecting the minimum score they want to see.

Although NG-Gamer has several hundreds of thousands unique visitors each month, few of them actually use the forums. These are mostly used by either the crewmembers themselves, or a group of hardcore visitors. NG-Gamer is working on a strategy to make their forums more attractive and expand their community.

One of the strategies used to attract more people to use the forums, etc. is the implementation of the previously mentioned option for users to contribute their own articles. Other options, such as a list of favorite boards, topics, newsposts, etc. are also to contribute to making NG-Gamer more appealing to users.

=== PSP-, PDA- and mobile phone versions ===
NG-Gamer has several versions of its website up and running. All of these versions are custom made so that they can be used in an optimal way with the corresponding platform. The PSP version of NG-Gamer went live on February 27, 2006. The PDA and mobile phone versions went live at launch.

== The NG-Gamer crew ==
=== The original crewmembers ===
- Christian de Jong : General Manager (left the team October 2007)
- Raoul Wolff : Communications Manager (left the team early 2006)
- Alex Klein : Editor (left the team early 2006)
- Dominique Pijnenburg : Editor
- Francis van Hulle : Editor (got fired July 2008))
- Jalke Peters : Editor (left the team early 2006)
- Joeri Crauwels : Editor (left the team in April 2012)
- Kenny Lammers : Editor (left the team early 2007)
- Michiel Hanswijk : Editor (left the team January 2008)
- Michel van Zanten : Editor (left the team early 2006)
- Niels Slotboom : Editor (left the team early 2006)
- Patrick van der Weide : Editor (left the team early 2006)
- Ron van de graaf : Editor (left the team early 2006)
- Tamara van Staalduinen : Editor (left the team June 2007, rejoined April 2008 but quit again early 2009)

=== Additional members ===
- Wesley Winterswijk : Editor (joined January 2006, left the team June 2008)
- Martijn Müller : Editor (joined February 2006)
- Mattias Vercauteren : Editor (joined February 2006, left the team June 2007)
- Christof Aerts : Editor (joined March 2006, left the team April 2008)
- Jurgen Van den Abbeele : Editor (joined July 2006, got fired in August 2007)
- Christophe Joye : Editor (joined June 2007)
- Rudemir Cousino : Editor (joined June 2007)
- Robert Wittenaar : Editor (joined August 2007)
- Daniël de Jaeger : Editor (joined August 2007, left April 2008)
- Daan de Jong : General Manager (joined October 2007)
- Sander Schetters : General Manager (joined October 2007, left early 2008)
- Edwin van Dalen : Editor (joined February 2008)
- Andreeas Firoiu : Editor (joined March 2008, left in September 2010)
- Patrick de Gussem : Editor (joined July 2008)
- Leroy van den Broek : Editor (joined July 2008, left September 2008)
- Daan van Dee : Editor (joined October 2008)
- David Henry : Editor (joined October 2008)
- Tim Leegstra : Editor (joined March 2009, left February 2012)

=== General Management, PR-management and Editors in Chief ===
==== Raoul Wolff and Christian de Jong ====
Along with Christian de Jong, Raoul Wolff was the founding member of NG-Gamer. He left early 2006 due to disagreement with Christian about the policy of NG-Gamer. His function as General Manager would not be succeeded. Christian kept his position as General Manager until his departure in October 2007. Christian no longer had the time or motivation to invest into NG-Gamer. Hence, he sold the website to Daan de Jong and Sander Schetters.

==== Daan de Jong and Sander Schetters ====
Daan de Jong would pick up his function as General Manager in October 2007 when he and Sander Schetters bought NG-Gamer from Christian de Jong. Sander however, left the team in early 2008 for unknown reasons.

==== Michiel Hanswijk ====
It was clear from the beginning that an Editor in Chief was needed. Therefore, Michiel Hanswijk was assigned this function in January 2006. During the course of the year he would also get assigned the job of PR-contact. He would keep fulfilling these functions until his departure in December 2007. The reason for this was that Michiel no longer saw the possibility to combine his personal life with his function as he simply did not have enough spare time to invest into NG-Gamer. His function would then be assigned to Dominique Pijnenburg. Michiel rejoined the crew though in June 2008. After the departure of Wesley Winterswijk, he would pick up his old function as PR-contact, which he would soon drop once again. This time it's because he has completely lost the time, being sponsored as a skater.

==== Kenny Lammers ====
Kenny Lammers started as PR-contact for NG-Gamer in January 2006. He supplied the website with review copies of games, goodies and games to give away, interviews with developers, etc. Due to his excellent work as PR-contact, he was also assigned the function of Editor in Chief in July 2006. Due to a hectic personal life, Kenny resigned from this function. His PR-contacts were taken over by Editor in Chief Michiel Hanswijk. Joeri Crauwels gained Kenny's function as Editor in Chief.

In January 2008, former PR-contact and Editor in Chief Kenny Lammers got into a car accident. While his car ended up a complete wreck, he and his girlfriend got out with a scare and some bruises. According to Kenny, someone above must have been watching over him. The circumstances involving the accident are unknown, but fatigue was certainly amongst the causes.

==== Joeri Crauwels ====
Joeri would pick up Kenny's function as Editor in Chief after his departure in March 2007. Joeri would keep fulfilling this function until his departure in January 2008. However, Joeri rejoined the crew in June 2008. As of September 2008 he would reprise his role as Editor in Chief alongside Dominique Pijnenburg until April 2012.

==== Dominque Pijnenburg ====
Dominique applied for free spot of Editor in Chief after the departure of Michiel. He was assigned this function several weeks later.
