= Xi (alternate reality game) =

- The Xi logo
- Developer: nDreams
- Publishers: SCEE, SCEA
- Engine: PlayStation Home
- Platform: PlayStation Home via PlayStation 3
- Release: March 23, 2009
- Genre: Alternate reality game

Xi (UK: /ˈsaɪ/ or US: /ˈzaɪ/) was the world's first console-based and virtual world-based alternate reality game. It was a one-time-only play, unfolding in real time, and only available on the PlayStation 3 through the social gaming network, PlayStation Home. The game was an adventure to help find "Jess" and the meaning of Xi by collecting fragments and butterflies found in a series of secret areas in Home that changed frequently. The game also challenged the users to search for clues in the real world. The game was created by nDreams who released several spaces for Xi. The game was promoted through a teaser campaign of clues and hints during the month prior to its release on March 23, 2009. The clues were hidden in the Menu Pad and videos in the central meeting point.

The game lasted a total of 12 weeks from its release. Xi and all of the corresponding spaces were exclusive to the European and North American versions of PlayStation Home, though there were also websites, videos, printed media and live events which were accessible to anyone. In September 2009, it was reported that the number of visits to the Xi spaces, including the ones after Xi's completion, had exceeded 5 million visits. A sequel, Xi: Continuum, was released in December 2012.

== History ==
=== Early history ===
"Xi started at the Edinburgh Interactive Festival a couple of years ago," (from 2009) says Patrick O'Luanaigh, the founder of nDreams. "I saw a talk from Pete Edwards, who runs Home for Sony. Home seemed really exciting, and I thought it would be really cool to have an ARG – something in there to grab people's attention and to make them want to come in. I came in and did a pitch to Phil Harrison and the Home team. They said: ‘Wow, we really like it'."

One of the game's developers revealed that it took 18 months for nDreams to develop Xi. The developer also revealed that a challenge of Xi was that it was live and they had to change things in the game because of the players taking part in the game in real time.

=== The launch of Xi ===
A month before the game's official release on March 23, 2009, clues and hints were seen in the users Menu Pad and in videos in the central meeting point of Home. The Menu Pad is where users access different things such as personal settings; the clues and hints were found in the "News" and "Latest Update" sections of the Menu Pad.

The first clue to appear in the News section was "jess are you there?----------Xi is almost ready". This clue first appeared on February 6, 2009, in Europe and on February 11, 2009, in North America.

The first video appeared on February 12, 2009, in Home's Bowling Alley (North America) and Home Square (Europe) and featured a big black monolith bearing the Greek capital letter 'Xi' and the graffiti version of the 'Xi' logo (more specifically, the one that was located in Europe's Home Square).

The monolith was later revealed to be a big black door in The Hub of 'Xi'. The door remained locked until the final days of the game.

Between February 12 and March 23, there were many clues and videos released in Home hinting at the nature and launch date of Xi. The last clue told the users that the graffiti logo which had appeared in Europe's Home Square and North America's Central Plaza would teleport players to 'The Hub' - a new Home space that acted as the information centre for the game. Xi had begun in earnest.

When users first accessed The Hub, they experienced a fly-through tour with the voice of 'Thom' offering a guided tour of the space and a brief introduction to the game's story: he is a member of the alphaAFK alpha testers who had helped to build Home, and one of his colleagues, Jess, has gone missing. After Thom's introduction, the user was given the chance to opt in or out. If they opted in, Thom gave them their first task.

This introduction remained the same for all players, no matter what date they started the game.

== Synopsis ==
The Hub, where it all started with Xi.

The first task was to find scattered pieces of the AlphaAFK symbol within The Hub. Collecting these unlocked a weblink to the alphaAFK clan website, which Thom then told users to access via the Online Getaway found in The Hub. Thom guided the users through a simple “Odd One Out” puzzle. After solving the puzzle and entering the answer into the HoloPAD in The Hub, users acquired the first of 24 fragments.

Users were also invited to talk to Stapler, a robot who explained each of the 20 optional expeditions that offered 20 butterflies. The first butterfly expedition asked users to name Jess's favorite band The Automatic, which could be discovered by reading through the blog posts on CafeConMiguel.com - the blog of another alphaAFK member. The users then needed to input the answer into the HoloPAD to receive the first of 20 butterflies.

Initially, only one fragment and one butterfly were available. New fragments and butterflies were made available every few days, as the Xi spaces were updated. Fragments were won by playing mini-games, solving puzzles, and searching for clues in Home and in the associated Xi websites. All 24 fragments were required to complete Xi; the butterfly expeditions were entirely optional (tougher) side-quests that often called for cooperation and collaboration between players in the real world.

The game's story followed Jess's struggle to protect a secret project she'd developed, codenamed 'Xi'. Its nature remained unclear throughout the game, though hints and speculation suggested it was some form of advanced technology. The main antagonist was a corporation called Veilcorp, which claimed Jess had been developing Xi for them until she absconded. This story was revealed through text-chat conversations between the alphaAFK testers; videos from Jess; blogs; puzzles; the Veilcorp website; and information discovered by players at live events.

Once the users had obtained all 24 fragments (which was first possible on 10 June 2009) they were able to pass through the monolith in The Hub and experience the game's conclusion. This restriction was lifted 24 hours later, as the alphaAFK enabled any player to pass through the monolith if they wished, regardless of how many fragments they had accumulated.

Immediately after passing through the monolith, players were prompted with a message asking the user if they wanted to complete Xi or return to The Hub. If they chose to complete Xi, they were prompted with another message warning them that if they continued Xi they will no longer be able to access the Xi spaces. After definitively choosing again to complete Xi, the users were taken to The White Hall.

The monolith, the mystery door in The Hub- the end of Xi's mystery.

At this point, the player was given a dilemma: Release Xi or Destroy Xi. The player had to choose one way or the other based only on the patchy information they had learned about Xi from the various biased sources during the game.

A video was then shown corresponding to the choice they made. In either case, the outcome was unpleasant: release Xi and it turns out to be a virus that brings down the banking system, causes global chaos, but perhaps resets the human race on a more sustainable course; destroy Xi and it turns out to have been an anti-spyware virus designed to protect the privacy of the world's citizens, and by destroying it, the player had allowed Veilcorp to take total control of business, government and all personal freedoms.

After the video, the player was taken deeper into The White Hall where they met a video-realistic version of Jess - or rather 'Jessica', who explained that this whole game was a recruitment exercise to attract and identify people with particular skills spanning the real and virtual worlds. She needed to find people who can make difficult decisions in unclear situations, particularly when it comes to guiding how the world uses technology in future. The player was then presented with a summary of their performance throughout the game before Jessica hints that she'll be in touch again when the time is right.

Depending on their performance, the player was given one or more digital rewards to keep in their Home apartment. The Xi Trophy was for simply completing the game. The Xi Fragment Master Trophy was for completing Xi with all 24 fragments; and the Xi Fragment Collector Trophy was for completing Xi with at least 12 fragments. The Xi Butterfly Master Trophy was for completing Xi with all 20 butterflies; and the Xi Butterfly Collector Trophy was for completing Xi with at least 10 butterflies.

== Locations ==
There were a total of 12 physical spaces in Xi. The White Hall wasn't a physical space that users could walk freely in. Each space served a purpose in completing Xi. Each mini-game in each space either unlocked a Fragment or a Butterfly. Some of the weird markings on the walls in some of the spaces were used for a couple of the challenges. The only spaces that are now available in Home are the Xi Museum (formerly Xi Alumni Hub), the Alpha Zone 1 spaces, and the Alpha Zone 3 spaces.

Name of Space	Features
The Hub	Was accessed by the "Teleport" that was found in the Central Plaza/Home Square; Users could no longer access this space if they completed Xi, but instead, they could access the Xi Alumni Hub; HoloPAD – Accessed Enter Code, HoloMail, Display fragments, Display butterflies, and Rate avatar; Stapler - Accessed the Expeditions; Online Getaway - Accessed Message Board, Video Vault, Miguel's Blog, Web Browser, AlphaAFK website, Jess247, and Veilcorp.com; Screen - told What's New; View weekly re-cap – Screen; Unregister yourself from Xi – Let users unregister from the game; Teleports 1, 2, and 3 - Accessed Alpha Zones 1, 2, and 3; The Monolith – Door to The White Hall; Door to go back to Central Plaza/Home Square
Alpha Zone 1 – Game Test Area	Was accessed by Teleport 1 in The Hub; after completing Xi, it was accessed by Teleport 1 in the Xi Alumni Hub; Now accessed via Teleport 1 in the Xi Museum; Hexoplis (Standard or Expert) – A race with mini-games: Rejected, Zombie Mall, Pollen, Sushihatsu, Angry Mountain, and Point of Sale; User have to beat the race within 6 minutes (Standard) or 5 minutes (Expert); Scoreboard; Door for Maximum-Tilt Lobby; Door for Adventure Lobby; Teleport back to The Hub (Xi Alumni Hub after completing Xi; now Xi Museum)
Alpha Zone 1 – Maximum-Tilt Lobby	Accessed by the door called "Maximum-Tilt Lobby" in the Game Test Area; Maximum-Tilt (Standard or Expert) - Mini-game with four hover bikes; Scoreboard; Tutorial Screen; Door to go back to Game Test Area
Alpha Zone 1 – Adventure Lobby	Accessed by the door called "Adventure Lobby" in the Game Test Area; Two text-based mini-games: Cavern of the Bandit King (Standard) and Corrupted (Expert); Door to go back to Game Test Area
Alpha Zone 2 – Light and Dark	Was accessed by Teleport 2 in The Hub; No longer accessible after completing Xi; The Good Aquarium - Mini-game; users were a fish and had to swim through the tank collecting food without getting harmed by other fish; The Evil Aquarium - Mini-game; same as The Good Aquarium except with more harmful fish; Puzzle 1 - Short Circuit; Users had to connect the battery's ends together in three variants of the mini-game; Puzzle 2 - Binary Bulbs; Users had to turn on a series of lights in ten rounds within the time limit of each round; Puzzle 3 - Fireflies; Users had to match the fireflies correct order that they lit up in fourteen rounds; Puzzle 4 - Flashlight Jigsaw; Users had to solve four rounds of jigsaw puzzles in the dark and use the flashlight to see if it was correct; Puzzle 5 - Shadow Match; Users had to match the characters with the correct shadows in four rounds; Teleport back to The Hub
Alpha Zone 3 – Entrance and Team Maze	Was accessed by Teleport 3 in The Hub; Was no longer accessible after completing Xi; Now accessible by Teleport 3 in the Xi Museum; Teamwork Maze – Users have to use teamwork to get through the maze; Enter the Ghost Maze - Door to the Ghost Maze; Enter the Riddle Maze - Door to the Riddle Maze; Enter the Expert Maze - Door to The Expert Maze; Teleport back to The Hub (now Xi Museum)
Alpha Zone 3 – Ghost Maze	Accessed by the door called "Enter the Ghost Maze" in Entrance and Team Maze; The Ghost Maze – Users have to make their way through the maze without touching a ghost. If they touch a ghost, they have to start over; Door to go back to Entrance and Team Maze
Alpha Zone 3 – Riddle Maze	Accessed by the door called "Enter the Riddle Maze" in Entrance and Team Maze; Riddle Maze – Users have to make their way through the maze solving riddles. If they incorrectly answer a riddle, they have to start over. However, if they have correctly answered one riddle and incorrectly answered another, they do not have to reanswer the correctly answered riddle.; Door to go back to Entrance and Team Maze
Alpha Zone 3 – The Expert Maze	During Xi, it could only be accessed by having the 18th Butterfly; Now it can be accessed freely by the door called "Enter the Expert Maze" in Entrance and Team Maze; Expert Maze – Users have to make their way through the maze by using the rules of the previous three mazes (teamwork, dodging ghost, and answering riddles) in this one maze; Door to go back to Entrance and Team Maze
Home Maintenance	Was accessed by the "Manhole cover" that was found in the Central Plaza/Home Square; No longer accessible after completing Xi; Open locker - Had iDENT for William Johnson; Enter padlock code - The code received from Stapler had to be entered here; Pick up the envelope - Letter from Thom; Security Terminals - New Staff Registration, Server File Optimiser, Elevator Power Circuit, Colour Code Entry, three Terminals Locked (there were three codes for the three locked terminals that when unlocked, revealed information); Controls – Users had to assemble a robot using a crane by dropping the robot parts down a chute in four levels; Call the elevator - Took users to Party at Jess's Apartment
Party at Jess's Apartment	Was accessed by "Call the elevator" in Home Maintenance; Jess's customized Summer House; It is now purchasable as a personal space for users in the "Xi Museum Shop" of the Xi Museum labeled Xi Party House; Picture - Safe behind it that needs a code; Video Screen - Paul Ballard music video (not available in personal space version); Flyer - For the party and there was a secret code that was to be entered into the HoloPAD; Door to go back to Home Maintenance (not available in personal space version); Door to go to Central Plaza/Home Square
The White Hall	Was accessed through the monolith in The Hub on June 10, 2009; No longer accessible after completing Xi; The end of Xi; Release Xi or Destroy Xi; Users met Jess; After completing, users received their Xi trophies; Xi Trophy - For completing Xi; Xi Fragment Master Trophy - For completing Xi with all 24 Fragments; Xi Fragment Collector Trophy - For completing Xi with at least 16 Fragments; Xi Butterfly Master Trophy - For completing Xi with all 20 Butterflies; Xi Butterfly Collector Trophy - For completing Xi with at least 18 Butterflies
Xi Museum; formerly Xi Alumni Hub	Xi Alumni Hub: Could only be accessed by completing Xi; Was accessed by the "Teleport" that was found in the Central Plaza/Home Square; Was added to the World Map (now Navigator) on July 2, 2009, but removed from Home on April 22, 2010; Users could no longer access The Hub if they completed Xi; Piece of paper - At top of stairs on a table; Use keypad - Panel at the top of the stairs; One Teleport - Took users to Alpha Zone 1 - Game Test Area; View Xi slideshow - Xi logo, slideshow of the 12 weeks of Xi; View screen - Showed how Xi started and the events over the 12 weeks; Alumni Hub Getaway - Accessed Web Browser, Xi Credits, Miguel's Blog, and Alumni Puzzle Site; By completing the Xi Alumni challenge, users received a Xi Alumni T-shirt; Door to go back to Central Plaza/Home Square; Xi Museum: Launched on December 23, 2010; Xi Alumni Hub is now called "Xi Museum"; Two Teleports - Accesses Alpha Zone 1 and Alpha Zone 3; Xi Museum Shop - Xi related items and items from nDreams; The Xi Quiz - A 5 question quiz about Xi; View Xi slideshow - Xi logo, slideshow of the 12 weeks of Xi; View screen - Shows how Xi started and the events over the 12 weeks

== Fragments ==
There were a total of twenty-four fragments that the users had to obtain through various puzzles and mini-games throughout Home and some puzzles in the real world. The fragments are different pieces of a picture of the logo of Xi which were viewable in the HoloPAD under Display fragments. The fragments were the main objectives of Xi for the users to complete. In addition to obtaining the sixth fragment, users also received a Xi T-shirt for their avatar.

Fragment name	Puzzle name	Requirements	Location
Initiation	Odd One Out	Assemble AlphaAFK logo from paper	The Hub
Postcards	Postcards	Identify pictures	Jess247 through the Online Getaway
Hexoplis	Hexoplis	Test six mini-games within six minutes	Alpha Zone 1 – Game Test Area
Maximum-Tilt	Maximum-Tilt	Maximum-Tilt Lobby: play Maximum-Tilt	Alpha Zone 1 – Maximum-Tilt Lobby
Caverns of the Bandit King	Caverns of the Bandit King	Play Caverns of the Bandit King	Alpha Zone 1 - Adventure Lobby
Miguel's Secret	Miguel's Blog	Find out Miguel's birthday	Miguel's Blog through the Online Getaway
Avatars	Avatars	Pass the security barrier under the manhole	Home Maintenance
Crazy Crane	Controls	Play the mini-game, Controls	Home Maintenance
Balance the Blocks	Server File Optimiser	Match up coloured blocks	Home Maintenance Security Terminal
The Lost Note	Important Info	Search for a note	Video Vault through the Online Getaway
Deep Water	The Good Aquarium & The Evil Aquarium	Play both mini-games	Alpha Zone 2 – Light and Dark
The Darkness	Short Circuit & Binary Bulbs	Puzzles 1 and 2	Alpha Zone 2 – Light and Dark
The Enlightenment	Fireflies, Flashlight Jigsaw & Shadow Match	Puzzles 3, 4 and 5	Alpha Zone 2 – Light and Dark
Zoom!	Zoom	Add numbers displayed in images	Jess247 through the Online Getaway
Power Up	Elevator Power Circuit	Power the elevators	Home Maintenance Security Terminal
Listen Carefully	Listen Carefully	Locate a code	Party at Jess's Apartment
Magic Marker	Magic Marker	Locate a code	Party at Jess's Apartment
Between the Lines	Between the Lines	Locate a code	Veilcorp.com through the Online Getaway
Teamwork	Teamwork Maze	Use teamwork to complete the maze	Alpha Zone 3 – Entrance and Team Maze
Face your Demons	Ghost Maze	Complete the maze without touching the ghosts	Alpha Zone 3 – Ghost Maze
Riddled	Riddle Maze	Complete the maze by solving riddles	Alpha Zone 3 – Riddle Maze
Scavenger Hunt	Scavenger Hunt	Locate numbers and solve a mathematical equation	Jess247, Red Bull Air Race, shopping complex, Bowling Alley, EA Sports Complex, Far Cry 2: Train Station, & Resistance Station
The Final Total	The Final Total	Figure out the binary code on the monolith	The Hub

== Butterflies ==
The butterflies were optional in completing Xi and were for the users who wanted a real challenge. There were twenty in all. Stapler was the robot that told the users what they must do or where to go in order to obtain the butterflies. The butterflies were viewable in the HoloPAD under Display butterflies.

Butterfly name	Quest name	Requirements	Location
Nymphalis Californica	Getting to know me	Find out Jess's favourite band	The Hub
Speyeria Diana	A foreign language	Identify pictures	Jess247 through the Online Getaway
Agraulis Vanillae	The big picture	Analyse a document	Video Vault through the Online Getaway, eight billboards scattered throughout Europe
Dircenna Klugii	Co-ordination	Identify location names	AlphaAFK website through the Online Getaway
Urban Proteus	Alpha Zone 1.5	Complete all Alpha Zone 1 mini-games on Expert	Alpha Zone 1 - Game Test Area, Maximum-Tilt Lobby, & Adventure Lobby
Hypothesis Lycaste	Stop all the clocks	Analyse clocks	Hexoplis of Alpha Zone 1 - Game Test Area
Marpesia Chiron	Turning Japanese	Open the padlocked locker	Home Maintenance
Euptoieta Hegesia	A sentimental journey	Fit codes together	AlphaAFK website through the Online Getaway
Danaus Plexippus	Nota Bene	Analyse a video	Video Vault through the Online Getaway, and HoloPAD
Colias Eurytheme	In her footsteps	Search for a website	Video Vault through the Online Getaway, Basilique Du Sacre Coeur De Montmartre in Paris
Vanessa Atalanta	Look Closely	Analyse a video	Video Vault through the Online Getaway
Papilo Machaon	Ignatius's quiz	Correctly answer questions	AlphaAFK website through the Online Getaway
Hypaimnas Misippus	Careless whispers	Find out a secret code	HoloPAD and Party at Jess's Apartment
Marpesia Coresia	Beat it	Open the safe	Party at Jess's Apartment
Papilo Troilus F.	Hidden in plain sight	Locate a hidden code	YouTube
Papilo Troilus M.	Jess's level	Correctly complete Jess's LittleBigPlanet level, "Papillon Alpha"	LittleBigPlanet
Junonia Genoveva	Street trail	Locate a code	Jess247 through the Online Getaway, streets near Sydney, Australia
Papilo Rutulus	Three dimensions	Complete a series of tasks for a code	Jess247 through the Online Getaway
Anartia Jatrophae	A maze of twisty passages	Complete the Expert Maze	Alpha Zone 3 – The Expert Maze
Heliconius Charithonia	By the numbers	Search for symbols of numbers	The Hub, Hexoplis, Maximum-Tilt Lobby, Alpha Zone 2, Miguel's Blog, and AlphaAFK website

== Post-Xi ==
After completing Xi and being returned to the central meeting point, users were no longer able to access The Hub, but instead, were able to access the Xi Alumni Hub through the same Teleport that The Hub was accessed through. After entering the Xi Alumni Hub, users were presented with one final challenge in which completing this final challenge awarded the users a Xi Alumni T-shirt for their avatar.

On July 2, 2009, the Teleport and Manhole cover were removed from the central meeting point and the Xi Alumni Hub was added to the world map (now Navigator) under the Xi logo chip in the users Menu Pad . All of the Xi spaces were removed except the Xi Alumni Hub and Alpha Zone 1 - Game Test Area, Maximum-Tilt Lobby, & Adventure Lobby. The Alpha Zone 1 spaces were accessed through the teleport in the Xi Alumni Hub.

Patrick O'Luanaigh told Edge magazine that nDreams "ended up doing 12 spaces, 24 minigames, 108 videos and four huge websites." He also mentioned that "By and large" everything went according to plan. nDreams had a chart that was 12 weeks long and that every weekday, something new was happening. "Getting in on Sony's project early meant nDreams found itself in a privileged position" notes Edge magazine. "We were able to really push Home," says O'Luanaigh. "We were given carte blanche to mess around." He also notes how the company was fortunate that there was a fairly large Home community already there and were really satisfied how people of different languages were communicating with each other by posting in other forums, not of their own language, and helping each other out to solve Xi. "Normally, language players are fairly separate. It's rare for people to interact like that, and it's really satisfying" says O'Luanaigh.

The Xi Alumni Hub was temporarily removed from PlayStation Home on April 22, 2010. Due to changes introduced with the Home client update 1.35, these spaces needed to be rebuilt to ensure that they continued to function as designed. nDreams also took this opportunity to provide access to some content from Xi that hadn't been seen since Xi ended, along with some items from Xi that are available to own.

On September 24, 2010, Patrick O'Luanaigh, the CEO of nDreams, confirmed on his Twitter that the Xi Spaces will return by Christmas 2010 under the new name "Xi Museum". On December 23, 2010, the "Xi Museum" launched featuring an updated Xi Alumni Hub (now called the Xi Museum), the three Alpha Zone 1 spaces (Game Test Area, Maximum-Tilt Lobby, and Adventure Lobby), and the four Alpha Zone 3 mazes (Teamwork Maze, Ghost Maze, Ridde Maze, and The Expert Maze). New items can be unlocked from the Xi Museum and Alpha Zone spaces. In addition, the Xi Museum features a Xi Museum Shop, with items such as a Maximum-Tilt bike and the robot Stapler for users personal spaces. The public space "Party at Jess's Apartment" that was featured during Xi can now be purchased as a personal space for the users. In Europe, users had a chance to win a Stapler companion by following nDreams Twitter feed.

== Sequel ==
Xi: Continuum was announced on November 26, 2012, and launched the following month on December 12 in EU and US and December 19 in Asia. It took place over a period of 47 days, though users could complete it at their own pace. Over the 47 days, it featured new content each day, either in Home, on external websites, or via community tasks. The objective was to stop a character named EatFlamingDeath and prevent a bomb from destroying the Continuum, and in turn, Home.
