= Slyde Handboards =

American water sports company

- Founder: Steve Watts; Angela Watts
- Headquarters: Orange County, California, U.S.
- Area served: North America
- Website: www.slydehandboards.com

Slyde Handboards was a bodysurfing and water sports company. It was co-founded in 2010 by Steve Watts and Russell Ellers, and they were later joined by Angela Watts.

== Product ==
The Wedge, Slyde's first handboard, was released in 2011, and brought in $20,000 in revenue. Slyde's beginner model, The Grom, which retails for under half the price of the Wedge, was released in 2017 after a successful Kickstarter campaign.

== History ==
Slyde started in Mr. Eller's Venice Beach garage and has since moved their headquarters to San Clemente, California.

=== Shark Tank Appearance ===
Slyde Handboards appeared on Season 7, Episode 24 of Shark Tank. Watts entered the tank seeking a $200,000 investment in exchange for 15% equity. They received offers from Kevin O'Leary, Robert Herjavec, Mark Cuban, and celebrity guest shark Ashton Kutcher. Slyde accepted the joint offer from Ashton Kutcher and Mark Cuban, who invested $200,000 in exchange for 22% equity of the company.

=== Promotion ===
Slyde Handboards was accepted into its first big retailer, Dick's Sporting Goods, in June 2018.

Over 30 surfers represent the brand as ambassadors by promoting the handboards on their social media accounts . In April 2019, Grant Baker, 3X Big Wave world champion, joined the Slyde Handboards team, which is the first time in history a professional surfer joined a bodysurfing/handsurfing company as a team rider.
