= Red Bull Illume =

Photography contest

Red Bull Illume is the world's largest adventure and action sports photography contest. Its aim is to showcase the most creative and captivating images from the adventure and action sports world, and celebrate the photographers working behind the lens. It is open to amateur and professional photographers alike, takes place every two years (since 2019) and features images and video submissions that showcase adventure sports such as surfing, kayaking, mountain biking, rock climbing and street sports like bmx, skate and parkour. After the winners are selected, the 50 top images are exhibited on two meter by two meter lightboxes in both outdoor and indoor exhibitions around the globe.

== History ==
In 2006, Red Bull Illume was founded by Ulrich Grill, a passionate photographer and former Red Bull athlete. At the time, he was running training workshops for photographers, and realized there weren't any photo contests dedicated to adventure and action sports. The idea for the Red Bull Illume Image Quest was born – a contest to celebrate not just the images, but the people behind the lens. Red Bull has been the main partner of Red Bull Illume since its inception.

The first edition was held in 2007 and resulted in 2,000 photographers from over 90 countries submitting more than 7,500 images. Fred Mortagne's black and white shot of a skateboarder shot from above was voted overall winner.

Further editions were held in 2010, 2013, 2016, 2019, 2021 and 2023.

== Judging Process ==
The winning images are selected by an international judging panel made up of around 50 photo editors, photographers, elite adventure sports athletes and other experts. The shots are chosen blind via an online system that shows only the image, without any information about the photographer to ensure a fair process. Five images from each category are shortlisted with one being crowned category winner. The overall winner is selected from the ten category winners. An exception are the Instagram category winners, who are selected by the public via a poll on the social media channel.

== In video games ==
In PlayStation Home, Red Bull released a virtual themed space for the Red Bull Illume on November 26, 2009. It is an exhibition of adventure and action sports photographs from Red Bull Illume. The winning photograph from each of the competition's ten categories is displayed on large illuminate cubes, imitating the real-life exhibit. There is also an exit to the Red Bull Air Race space and the Red Bull Beach space which features the Red Bull Flugtag.
