= PlayStation Home =

Social gaming platform developed by London Studio

- Developer: London Studio; Loot Interactive (products); Outso (content); Heavy Water (content); Virtuos (content)
- Type: Online community service Virtual world
- Launched: 11 December 2008
- Current version: 1.87
- Last updated: 1 April 2015 (last update)
- Platform: PlayStation 3
- Status: Closed (31 March 2015)
- Members: 41 million (at time of closure)

PlayStation Home was a virtual 3D social gaming platform developed by Sony Computer Entertainment's London Studio for the PlayStation 3 (PS3) on the PlayStation Network (PSN). It was accessible from the PS3's XrossMediaBar (XMB). Membership was free but required a PSN account. Upon installation, users could choose how much hard disk space they wished to reserve for Home. Development of the service began in early 2005 and it launched as an open beta on 11 December 2008. Home remained as a perpetual beta until its closure on 31 March 2015.

Home allowed users to create a custom avatar, which could be groomed realistically. Each avatar was given a personal apartment that users could decorate with free, bought, or won items. Users could travel throughout the Home world, which was frequently updated by Sony and its partners. Public spaces were made for display, entertainment, advertising, and networking. Home's primary forms of advertising included spaces themselves, video screens, posters, and mini-games. Home also featured many singleplayer and multiplayer mini-games, and hosted a variety of special events, some of which provided prizes to players. Users could use items won to further customise their avatar or apartments.

== History ==
The initial "Central Plaza" was indoors and separated from other spaces.

PlayStation Home was originally named "Hub", and started as a 2D online lobby for the PlayStation 2 game The Getaway: Black Monday. However, the online userbase for the PlayStation 2 was too narrow and the project was soon ported to the PlayStation Network for the PlayStation 3. Phil Harrison, then president of SCE Worldwide Studios at the time, liked the idea of having a virtual 3D community hub for PlayStation gamers, and transferred the project to what would become PlayStation Home. In a 2007 keynote speech, Phil Harrison used the term "Game 3.0" to describe the service.

Home had been speculated since the launch of PSN, when Sony expressed interest in such a service, specifically trophies (known at the time as "entitlements") for first-party titles. PlayStation Home, as a feature, was first publicly mentioned in an interview with NG-Gamer. This was later detailed by Kotaku and finally confirmed by NG-Gamer. It was officially announced by Phil Harrison on 7 March 2007, during his keynote speech at the 2007 Game Developers Conference where it was originally scheduled for a global public release in October 2007.

Home was delayed and expanded multiple times before initially releasing. Invitations to the closed beta were offered to winners of a weekly Warhawk online gaming event. In August 2008, Sony sent additional invitations to select users who downloaded a new Home XMB theme in Japan and North America. Sony Computer Entertainment Europe (SCEE) and Sony Computer Entertainment Hong Kong (SCEHK) also sent out invitations to select users for a closed beta. Users who purchased more than HK$60 or SG$12 worth of content in a single transaction over the PlayStation Store from 29 August – 12 September 2008, were also invited. In November 2008, Sony Computer Entertainment America (SCEA) invited annual Qore subscribers. After major version 1.0, invitations were sent worldwide.

Home's open beta test began on 11 December 2008. In March 2009, an alternate reality game involving puzzle and intrigue called Xi proved popular after it was released by nDreams for Home. In June 2009, Peter Edwards, Director of Home for SCEE, reported that the number of users exceeded 7 million and that 80% of users were male, aged 18 to 35. At TGS 2009, Kaz Hirai announced that Home had been downloaded by 8 million users. Jack Buser, Director of Home for SCEA, stated that "beta" would not be removed from the name. In a Eurogamer interview with Peter Edwards on 24 July 2009, Edwards commented that the service would no longer be beta when it "[represented] a kind of final quality." On 14 October 2009, Jack Buser commented that "the vision of Home [had] evolved." He said that originally, they built Home as a "social network for gamers", but it developed into a "game platform, first and foremost." On 17 December 2009, SCEA released its first massively multiplayer online game, produced specifically for Home, called Sodium, a planned four-part series of games, but only two parts were released by the time of Home's closure. The first part was Sodium One.

In February 2010, emails were sent out to a select few PlayStation Home members inviting them to participate in a private beta test for the service. This beta test was for feedback on certain changes suggested by the Home community.

North America's central meeting point, the Central Plaza from version 1.30

The first global "public space" was released on 10 June 2010, allowing all users from the Asian, European, Japanese, and North American Homes to converge in one space. This space was called the FevaArena Global Pitch Area, which was dedicated to the 2010 FIFA World Cup. The Arena allowed all of Home's users to participate in events and mini-games to celebrate the 2010 FIFA World Cup.

In June 2010, Sony released a virtual replica of their E3 2010 booth in all versions of Home. The virtual E3 booth, slightly modified, returned the following year with previews of seven different games and the PlayStation Vita, with virtual rewards for watching the videos as well as a demo of a new PlayStation Home game, "Scribble Shooter". In addition, Sony's E3 press conference was streamed live in PlayStation Home in a special virtual theatre, as well as other live interviews that occurred during the week of E3 2011. The E3 virtual booth returned again for E3 2012, this time featuring previews of 12 games as well as a virtual avatar of Christina Lee (host of PSN's Pulse) hosting a special E3 Quest for all 12 games with rewards. Finishing the quest granted access to the VIP section previewing upcoming PlayStation Home games and content, including the upcoming massively multiplayer online racing game Mercia, as well as Hell Fire Games' upcoming Home Tycoon. The E3 virtual booth returned the following year for E3 2013, once again featuring previews of multiple games, and a quest where players could earn a number of rewards. PlayStation Home did not feature a virtual E3 booth in 2014.

On 20 April 2011, Home released version 1.50, which dramatically improved the physics and graphics engines. Sodium 2: Project Velocity was also released; the second and final part of Sodium to be released.

In November 2011, a new area known as the "Hub" was released, featuring a variety of games, including Cogs from Lazy 8 Studios. The Hub also featured an "Activity Board" and a "User Generated Content" events system. Surrounding the Hub were districts based on game genres to suit users' moods. Users could also watch full-length movies for free as an effort by online video distributor Crackle via Loot Interactive. The movies were available on all Loot Entertainment on Demand (EOD) screens throughout PlayStation Home.

In August 2014, Sony Computer Entertainment Japan announced that it was shutting down the service in Japan and other Asian territories. After September, users in these regions could no longer purchase content. In September, Sony Computer Entertainment America and Sony Computer Entertainment Europe announced the final closure of Home in their respective regions. New content ceased to be published after 12 November, and users were given until 3 December to purchase content, after which, users could no longer purchase content. The official closure of Home occurred on 31 March 2015, worldwide.

PlayStation Home's logo was featured as a collectible 'artifact' in the 2020 video game Astro's Playroom, a 3D platformer developed by Japan Studio's Team Asobi which was pre-installed on every PlayStation 5 console.

== Operation ==
PlayStation Home's point of view was from a third-person perspective. Upon entering Home, users were greeted with the "Message of the Day" containing Home news. During loading screens, users were presented with help tips on how to use Home.

=== User interface ===
PlayStation Home had no on-screen interface during exploration; however, all of Home's features were available from the controller. Options included "Quick Chat", a gestures menu, the "Menu" and "Safe" screens, and an in-game XMB. Sony originally planned to allow users to play videos and music stored on their hard drives on virtual screens and stereos. However, these features were never implemented, as Sony was not able to resolve potential licensing issues.

The "Menu Screen" (formerly referred to as the Menu Pad, and before that, a virtual PSP during the pre-open beta) was laid out similar to the PS3's XMB. There were seven categories on the menu, which were Navigator, Personal, Social, Wardrobe, Redecorate, Options, and Help. The Personal category featured an inventory, which contained a user's portable objects, as well as any companions that could follow the user around (such as a pet dog). The Personal category also let users see their purchased items, rewards, downloads, and their PSN profile. The Social category let users see their friends' locations, group activities, game launching events, the message of the day, and news.

Users could take screenshots of Home in either first- or third-person view and save them to their PS3's hard drive. With the use of Loot's Active Duty Camera (a premium item), users could also record videos in Home while in personal spaces or clubs.

The "Safe Screen" was used for reporting, changing communication settings, and quick access to the user's personal space and XMB friends list. The Navigator (formerly known as the World Map) was also laid out like the XMB, and sorted locations into categories based on the space's purpose.

=== Communication ===
Users could communicate in a variety of ways in Home. Along with the existing PSN messaging system, users were able to write text messages to each other using either a physical or on-screen keyboard. These messages appeared in speech bubbles over the avatar's head and in a chat log. Users could switch between text chat and voice chat from within the chat log. Voice chat, with the use of a headset, was available within personal spaces and clubs, or on private voice chat channels with groups of up to eight users. The user could also perform visible gestures (or "e-motes") such as waving, nodding, or dancing. A "quick chat" feature, with predetermined phrases, was also available. Users could also indicate the emotional status of their avatar, which was displayed below their name. Some avatar costumes also had additional e-motes.

=== Economy ===
Although the service itself could be used free of charge, premium content was available to purchase from various stores in the shopping complex and in certain spaces. Users could browse and pay for items, such as virtual clothing and furniture, by accessing a shop and using its PlayStation Store interface. Items were paid for with real currency using funds from the user's PlayStation Network Wallet. Alongside content designed by Sony Computer Entertainment, other companies were also able to sell virtual goods through their own stores in Home. For example, Diesel, Ligne Roset, and Game were represented in Home with their own stores where users could purchase virtual items based on each company's own clothing and furniture designs.

Advertising was prominent in Home's public spaces. The majority of advertisements were focused on PlayStation-related content, although other video gaming-related brands were also represented. Most advertising was targeted to specific regional audiences.

=== Pre-order bonuses ===
To advertise games in the North American Home, Sony released pre-order bonuses for PS3 games, mainly from Amazon.com. The first Home pre-order bonus was for the PS3-exclusive Killzone 2. Users in the North American Home who pre-ordered Killzone 2 from Amazon.com received free additional costumes for their avatar. On 16 February 2009, if users located a Helghast soldier in the North American Home, they were granted access to the Killzone 2 demo. Other Amazon.com pre-orders bonuses were given for inFamous ("Reaper" costume), Darksiders ("Ruin Head Mask" and "War Armor"), MAG ("S.V.E.R. Barracks" personal space), and BioShock 2 ("Big Daddy" costume).

Ratchet & Clank Future: A Crack in Time also received a pre-order bonus from Game Crazy. Users who pre-ordered the "Space Package" for the game received a PlayStation Home Avatar Skin.

==== Total Game Integration ====
Total Game Integration (TGI) began in 2011 and became Home's unique way of promoting upcoming PS3 games that included Home pre-order bonuses from Amazon.com. Instead of pre-ordering directly from Amazon.com, users could pre-order the promoted game from within PlayStation Home to receive Home and/or in-game bonuses. The first game to utilize the Total Game Integration was Killzone 3, with the bonus being the "Helghast Jetpack". The Central Plaza was redesigned as an ISA base of operations for the event. The second TGI pre-order that redesigned the Central Plaza was the "Exploding Zombie Outfit" for Dead Island. The next TGI pre-order, a "Nathan Drake" costume, was for Uncharted 3: Drake's Deception. This TGI pre-order featured a Game Space called "Fortune Hunter", specifically designed for the Total Game Integration. The mini-game utilised the entire space which was a partial recreation of the Yemen level from Uncharted 3's multiplayer. The last TGI pre-order bonus, "Boost Gem Trial Pack 1", was for Street Fighter X Tekken. For the first time in Home history, users were able to brawl using their Home avatars and could unlock Ryu and Kazuya costumes (which allowed users to throw fireballs and perform custom jump kick attacks) by completing all 10 SFxTK challenges. A portion of The Hub was redesigned for this TGI.

The vouchers for the Amazon.com pre-order bonuses were sent out within ten days after the games' release and expired 90 days after the games' release. The European and Japanese versions of Home also had chances to get these pre-order bonuses as well, but through different pre-order promotions and events.

=== PlayStation Home TV ===
On 23 December 2009, SCEE launched PlayStation Home TV to the European Home, with news and event information. If users had a community event that they thought should have been featured on Home TV, or any other news, they could email Home TV. New episodes of Home TV were released monthly and were featured in the Home Theatre.

== Avatar and personal spaces ==
A PlayStation Home avatar in the Harbour Studio personal space

Users were given an avatar and an apartment which they could personalize with their own choice of decor and furnishings. The user's avatar was the means of travel and communication, while personal spaces and clubs were means of expressing themselves and meeting new people and friends.

=== Avatar ===
Users could create their own avatar or use one of several preset avatars available. Users could customise a variety of their avatar's features, which included gender, skin tone, hair, body shape, and facial structure. They could also customise their avatar's clothing and accessories using a set of standard items that could be obtained from a variety of places, including the clothing shops in Home's shopping complex, items won from Home's mini-games, or PS3 games that supported Home rewards.

Users could access their wardrobe from the Menu Screen at any time and location, except when in another user's personal apartment. The wardrobe contained two sections: one was the main wardrobe for frequently used items (capacity of 500), and the other was a storage section for less frequently used items. New items were marked accordingly. Users could also filter the wardrobe view to only display favourite, purchased, rewards, or recently acquired items.

=== Personal spaces ===
Each user had a personal space which they could modify and change suitably. The initial basic apartment, the Harbour Studio, was free and offered users limited options for customization and personalization. Users could invite any other Home user (even cross-region, unless space was region locked) to their personal space. Some personal spaces, such as the PlayStation Home Mansion, had a built-in TV that played content from PlayStation (such as PlayStation.Blog). Loot Interactive's personal spaces had a variety of content that could be played on their Entertainment on Demand (EOD) screens. Users could also place their own digital photographs in picture frames to display on the walls of their apartment. While the Harbour Studio and basic furniture was provided to all users free of charge, premium personal spaces and furniture could be bought from stores. Other ways to obtain furniture, decorative ornaments, or even entire personal spaces included winning mini-games in Home and from playing certain PS3 games that supported Home rewards.

Premium personal spaces were available from the Home Estates store in Home's shopping complex. Sony released many premium personal spaces for Home, from both first party and third-party developers. Various premium apartments were available to all of the regions; however, some were region exclusive. The first premium personal space released was the Summer House. Loot's Sunset Yacht (formerly Amaterasu Yacht) personal space was the first personal space to allow users to set the mood of the setting (e.g. sunrise, sunset, day, night). In addition to the standard features of personal spaces, Loot's Space Apartment also allowed users to view Twitter feeds from a ticker, and search for photos from their Flickr account and display them on photo screens.

PS3 games could also have premium spaces dedicated to them. For example, the Visari Throne Room was based on Visari's Throne Room from the last level of Killzone 2. Sony also provided the opportunity to receive free apartments. The Chamber Apartment was the first and was only available in May 2009 in the North American Home. The PlayStation Home Mansion (North America and Europe) was Home's first expandable personal space; multiple rooms required purchasing in order to own the whole mansion (e.g. first floor, second floor, garage, and swimming pool).

Blueprint: Home was a personal space designer tool which allowed users to create, build, and save up to five of their own personalized apartments. With a variety of different style packs, users could craft their own personalized apartment, ranging from 60 square metres to 25 rooms. Users could move their apartment to various places, ranging from a country field to the top of a skyscraper. Users could also add rooms, doors, windows, wallpaper, flooring, ceilings, feature objects, exteriors, skies, and environments. Blueprint: Home was developed by nDreams and released on 1 August 2012, in Europe and North America.

==== Clubhouse ====
Users were able to purchase and form clubs. There were four clubhouse designs available to purchase – the Basic Clubhouse, the Desert Haven, nDream's War Room Clubhouse, and the Crystal Seashores Clubhouse. Each club had a leader, who was the user that purchased the club. The leader could elect up to 4 sub-leaders and could have up to 32 members in total, including the owner. A user could only be a member of up to five clubs, including the club that the user may have been the leader of. Though the user could own multiple clubhouse designs, they could only be the leader of one club and decided which clubhouse design would be used as the meeting place for their club. In a similar way to personal spaces, the club's owner was able to set up and decorate a private clubhouse as a meeting point for club members, and the club members could enter the clubhouse at any time. The clubhouses also featured a notice board where the leader or sub-leaders could post messages and announcements to other members. Japan's Basic Clubhouse's video screen had the option to access a Home member's page after they had entered their PSN information. Users could block other users from being a member of their club. In addition to all the standard features of the clubhouses, the War Room Clubhouse helped club owners or sub-leaders get their message across during club meetings or discussions. It also included a special access point allowing users to teleport from the War Room to other set locations.

On 2 December 2010, a free exclusive club released for PlayStation Plus subscribers in Europe. The PlayStation Plus Private Members Club was a bar area with several tables and a two-to-four player card game with special rewards. The space also had Plus news, accessed by reviewing a cocktail menu or watching the trailers running on an in-game video screen. On 11 April 2012, a new club called the "x7 Club" was released in North America, and could only be accessed by Plus subscribers, or users who had purchased one of the select Home exclusive items. All x7 members received special discounts, free items, and early access to select content before it got released to the public. The club featured a dance floor and a mini-game called FLIRT.

==== Stage Sets ====
Stage Sets were premium personal spaces where users who had a video capture system could make their own machinimas. Loot released four different Stage Sets for users to create and film their own machinimas with, and provided various tools within the Stage Sets (e.g. lighting and props) to help the users create their own machinimas. Loot also had an array of items available at their Loot store in the shopping complex.

== Public Spaces ==
Home consisted of various locations for players to interact and participate in activities, which were produced by both Sony Computer Entertainment and various third parties. Spaces on the Navigator were broken up into categories based on each space's publisher and/or purpose. Spaces' names and availability varied based on the user's location.

There were four different versions of Home, which were based on four regions: Asia, Europe, Japan, and North America. Countries joined whichever Sony Computer Entertainment division they were under. Japan was the only country with its own version of Home. SCEHK operated the Asian Home, SCEE operated the European Home, SCEJ operated the Japanese Home, and SCEA operated the North American Home. The different regions' Home environments had similar and different features between each other.

=== Core Spaces ===
The Hub; North America's new central meeting point as of 3 November 2011 featuring Cogs at the centre.

The Core Spaces were the spaces made by Sony Computer Entertainment specifically for the Home environment, and served as the central meeting point for users. These were the main spaces of Home and were updated the most. They were also where most events occur. These spaces included a central meeting point; a bowling alley and gaming arcade; a shopping complex; a café; various game, developer, and company spaces; the PlayStation Events spaces; and the districts.

The Home Square (Europe, Asia, and Japan) or "The Hub" (North America) was Home's central meeting point where users commonly met and chat. It connected all of the Core Spaces together, and was where much of the advertising occurred. There were five distinct districts for specific game genres. Europe's Home Square and The Hub featured a "districts design" to access the districts. They also featured an "Activity Board" allowing users to access reward giving quests, which sometimes included users having to visit various places and/or play various mini-games.

==== List of districts ====
- Action District – Action District was reminiscent of a first-person shooter level providing access to action and horror games. From the Action District, users could access the games Bootleggers '29, Dead Island Total Game Integration, and Novus Prime.
- Sportswalk – Sportswalk featured instant major league sports scores, headlines and highlights, and sports-themed games. It featured PlayStation Home Hold' em tables (and access to its space), as well as PlayStation Home Sports Trivia.
- Adventure District – Adventure District featured adventure-themed games. It featured a jungle with tropical areas to explore, including an ancient temple, a coastal shoreline, and a beachfront bar. The space also served as an access point for the game Cutthroats: Battle for Black Powder Cove.
- Pier Park (North America only) - Pier Park was a waterfront boardwalk with a carnival, puzzle, outdoor, and arcade games. Users could ride a ferris wheel with other users, access the RC Rally space, and dance at the dance zone, which was reminiscent of the "Listen@Home" kiosk that was featured in the former "Central Plaza". "Indie Park" and the "Theater Lobby" could be accessed from Pier Park.
- Indie Park – Indie Park allowed users to access various mini-games showcasing various indie developers. This zone allowed indie developers to showcase their work.

==== Other Core Spaces ====
- Home Theater (Asia, Europe, and Japan), or Theater Lobby (North America) – A virtual theater where users could view a range of video content such as film trailers, game trailers, video game features from first-party (such as Qore) and third-party publishers (such as Eurogamer), full-length TV shows, and podcasts from various gamer organizations. The Theatre Lobby also featured a shop where users could purchase film related clothes and other items, as well as play the mini-game, Scribble Shooter.
- Bowling Alley (Europe and North America) or the Game Space (Asia and Japan) – A space that contained social mini-games such as 10-pin bowling and pool billiards. It also featured a variety of arcade-machine games including Echochrome. Prizes were awarded for beating the arcade-machine games. The Game Space also featured dart boards, as well as arcades from the Namco Museum.comm PSN downloadable game.
- Shopping Centre (Europe), Mall 1st Floor/2nd Floor (North America), or Shopping Mall (Asia and Japan) – The core space where the majority of purchases were made. The shopping complex allowed users to buy new clothes, accessories, premium locations (personal spaces or clubs), and other items. Purchases used PlayStation Network Wallet funds, and worked in a manner similar to the PlayStation Store. The shopping complex featured various stores for specific products, a video screen, advertising posters, and a place to play chess. All stores could be accessed from the Navigator.
- Home Café (Asia and Japan), the Gamer's Lounge (North America), or the PlayStation Vita Lounge (Europe) – A two-story virtual café. The space had featured "developer talks" about certain games. The Gamer's Lounge was also the host space for the Featured Game nights in North America. The Home Café for Japan had been remodeled as the "Music Café" and featured the first floor as a "Sound Space” and the second floor as a "Gallery Space" displaying various Sony entertainment products and a Questionnaire with rewards. The PlayStation Vita Lounge featured trailers and information on the PS Vita and its launch titles and was updated with quests.
- Hong Kong/Korea/Singapore/Taiwan Lounge (Asia only) – Unlike other pan-Asia spaces such as the Home Square, this lounge was exclusive to users of the same region only. Users could come here to find out about country-exclusive events and news.

==== PlayStation Events Space ====
The PlayStation Events Space opened to the public during special events. It consisted of six spaces – Events Landing, The Gallery, the Presentation Podium, The Backstage Pass, The Observatory, and the PlayStation Network Sphere – and was a venue for special events, announcements, and parties.

=== Game Spaces ===
Sony Computer Entertainment and various third parties could create dedicated "Game Spaces" for specific games. These spaces generally depicted a level of the game itself and had mini-games or interactions related to the game. There were over forty Game Spaces that were released for Home. These Game Spaces varied depending on the region the user was in.

=== Game Developer Spaces ===
The EA Sports Complex Red Poker Room

Video game developers were able to create "Developer Spaces" for their developing company to showcase their products in Home. These spaces acted similarly to Game Spaces except they were not for a specific game. These spaces generally had mini-games related to their company or games and offered a wide range of content for purchase based on their company. There were twelve Game Developer Spaces for Home.

=== Non-gaming Company Spaces ===
Non-gaming-related companies could also create sponsored "Company Spaces" for Home. These also acted similarly to Game Spaces but were specifically made to sponsor the company's products.

The first company to do this was Red Bull with their Red Bull Space, which released on 8 January 2009, for Europe and North America and featured the Red Bull Air Race mini-game. The Air Race was a virtual version of the real-life event. On 26 November 2009, Red Bull released two new spaces for Europe and North America, one for the Red Bull Illume and the other for the Red Bull Flugtag. The Illume space had an exhibition of action and adventure sports photographs from Red Bull Illume. The winning photograph from each of the competition's ten categories were displayed on large illuminate cubes, imitating the real-life exhibit. The Red Bull Beach space had the Red Bull Flugtag mini-game where users could compete against one another by launching one of five flying machines off of a 30-foot high deck to try to achieve flight. It also featured a Red Bull Jukebox with ten different tunes from Red Bull. All three of the Red Bull spaces were released to the Asian Home on 17 June 2010. On 5 January 2012, Red Bull released their first personal space for Home, the Red Bull House of Skate, which featured an indoor skate park.

Phil Harrison stated that locations built around famous coffee, drinks, clothing, and record companies, along with major retailers and other such companies could feature content depending on the company's desire to create Home content.

== Game launching ==
Game launching was a feature in Home which allowed users to launch PS3 games while in Home. There were two types of game launching: full and simplified. Full game launching support allowed users to organize and start multi-player games with other Home users, who may or may not be on their friends lists. Users could set up a full game launching session by going into their menu screen, selecting "Game Launching", and setting up a session with advanced options. They could also join an existing session. When users had set up a game that was ready to launch, the name of the game and how many players had joined the session was shown under the users' names above their avatar's head. By using the game launching feature, users were entered directly into the game, bypassing the normal title screen. After the match ended, users could either quit the game and be returned to their XMB, or they could quit the game and be returned to Home.

Simplified game launching, also known as universal game launching, was implemented with Core Client update v1.30 and allowed any PS3 game to be launched from Home. With simplified game launching, users could insert a game into their PS3 while in Home and follow the on-screen directions. Users had a limited number of options to select with simplified game launching. For instance, they could not choose what map or level they wanted, nor could they choose what settings for the map or level within Home. Users had to do that after the game had been launched. The name of the game and how many users had joined the session was also shown under the users' names above the avatars' heads.

== User-generated content ==
Picture frames were the first feature to support user-generated content with photo sharing. The inFamous Game Space also supported user-generated content by allowing users to create their own unique graffiti designs in the graffiti mini-game and save it to their PS3s HDD to display for their friends. Users were also able to create their own apartments with nDreams' Blueprint: Home. On 16 October 2009, Rockstar Games began having "Beaterator Parties" at the Listen@Home station in North America's former Central Plaza. Beaterator is a PSP game that allows users to mix their own music and produce their own loops. During Beaterator sessions, Rockstar Games played Beaterator tracks that users had uploaded to the Rockstar Games Social Club.

== Games ==
PlayStation Home was a host for several games, exclusive to PlayStation Home. In October 2009, Jack Buser announced that PlayStation Home had developed into a "game platform, first and foremost." From then, several PlayStation Home exclusives were released. The first game was Xi, which was released before the change in development to a gaming platform. The more prominent PlayStation Home exclusive games included:

=== Xi ===
Xi (UK: /ˈsaɪ/ or US: /ˈzaɪ/) was the world's first console-based and virtual world-based alternate reality game. The game was an adventure that took place in a series of secret areas in Home that changed frequently. The goal of the game was to help find "Jess" and the meaning of the letter Xi by collecting fragments and butterflies. The game also involved the users to search for clues in the real world. This game was created by nDreams who released several spaces for Xi.

The Xi Museum featured an updated Xi Alumni Hub, the three Alpha Zone 1 spaces (Game Test Area, Maximum-Tilt Lobby, and Adventure Lobby), and four Alpha Zone 3. In addition, the Xi Museum featured a Xi Museum Shop, with items such as a Maximum-Tilt bike and the robot Stapler for users’ personal spaces. Users could also purchase the public space "Party at Jess's Apartment" that was featured during Xi. A sequel called Xi: Continuum released in December 2012. It took place over a period of 47 days, though users could complete it at their own pace. Over the 47 days, it featured new content each day, either in Home, on external websites, or via community tasks. The objective was to stop a character named EatFlamingDeath and prevent a bomb from destroying the Continuum, and in turn, Home.

=== Sodium ===
Sodium was the first Home based massively multiplayer online game released on 17 December 2009, to the European and North American versions of Home and on 17 June 2010, to the Japanese version. This game was developed by Outso and published by Lockwood Publishing, and was the first part of a planned four-part series of games for Home (only two were released by the time of Home's closure). Like in Xi, there was a space for the game that could be accessed through the Navigator. The space was called the "Sodium Hub" and featured the Salt Shooter Game. The first five levels were entirely free, while additional levels and experiences could be unlocked with the purchase of virtual items. New games, virtual items, and community events were added.

Sodium 2: Project Velocity was released on 16 June 2011. Unlike its predecessor,Sodium 2 was completely free to play. The game involved high-speed racing, similar to the Wipeout series of games. Sodium 2 featured a single player mode that allowed users to hone their skills and progress through the Sodium 2 XP system. Users could complete objectives, earn Sodium Credits, and compete on the worldwide leader board. In addition to single player, Sodium 2 featured real-time multiplayer, where users could race against friends or strangers.

=== The Midway ===
The Midway was a series of three games developed by Mass Media Inc.

- The Midway was a carnival-style space released on 1 July 2010, in Europe and North America. The space featured ten mini-games with ten rewards for each mini-game, in addition to a free personal space called Darla's Den. Users could purchase a "Gold Ticket" (50 tickets) to have access to all of the games until they were out of tickets. The space also featured a random "free-to-play" mini-game that occurred every fifteen minutes, in addition to one specific mini-game (Miz Fortunate) that was free-to-play every five minutes.
- The Midway 2 was released on 9 December 2010, in Europe and North America and expands on from The Midway. Just like The Midway, it was a carnival-style space and added ten more mini-games with rewards (including Miz Fortune from "The Midway", with new rewards). The space also featured the random free-to-play mini-game, most of which occurred every 15 minutes.
- The Midway 3 was released on 16 May 2012, in Europe and North America and expands on from The Midway and The Midway 2. Just like the first two Midways, this space was a carnival-style space and added ten more mini-games with rewards (including Miz Fortune from the previous games, with new rewards). Like Midway 2, the space also featured the random free-to-play mini-game, most of which occurred every 15 minutes.

Along with the release of The Midway 3, Mass Media released a central hub for the Midways called the Hot Zone. The Hot Zone featured an air hockey mini-game, a "Redemption Centre" (where users could redeem their Hot Zone points), a Ticket Booth to purchase more tickets for Midways mini-games, access to the three Midways, Darla's Den personal space, and a registration for The Midway Cash Carnival Sweepstakes. Users that played any of the Midways mini-games were entered into the Cash Carnival sweepstakes (was open to US citizens only), where users could win weekly prizes from Sony Electronics with a grand prize of US$15,000 (May 2012 – November 2012).

=== Novus Prime ===
Novus Prime was a free-to-play multiplayer game in PlayStation Home developed by Hellfire Games. The game allowed users to play missions in either single player or multiplayer cooperative format. Users could form teams of up to four players and embark on missions where they employed weaponry in battles against fleets of enemies. In addition to the Navigator, users could access Novus Prime from the Action District. Novus Prime received two expansions – Escalation on 31 March 2011 and Vindication on 11 January 2012 – each adding new missions, weapons, enemies, races, rewards, as well as a personal space.

=== Aurora ===
Aurora was a game world with challenges and secrets to uncover that evolved over time with new features, characters, games, and narrative. Aurora featured the mini-game "OrbRunner" where users could gain XP and unlock special rewards by defending the isles from enemies. It also featured the mini-game "Sky Fishing" where users could sky fish for various items to add to their collection journal. There were also various information points with information about Aurora. Users could also complete the 12 tasks of "Collect-O-Rama", which upon completing granted the users the "Collect-O-Rama Pack". Another mini-game was Aurora Defense where users defended the isles of Aurora. Aurora was made by nDreams and was released on 17 March 2011

=== No Man's Land ===
No Man's Land was a multiplayer third-person tactical shooter, featuring a cover-based movement system and 4v4 team battles. The game was developed by VEEMEE and released in North America on 20 June 2012, and in Europe on 25 July 2012. Following the completion of a tutorial session, players were given an introductory loadout that allowed access to the game. Armour and weapon upgrades could be purchased from in-game Commerce Points in a variety of combinations, which VEEMEE planned to evolve in time. The game featured two modes: Scavengers and Team Deathmatch. Team Deathmatch was a time-limited game mode that involved killing as many enemy players as possible. In the Scavengers game mode, teams had to collect salvage packs from the depleted cityscape. These resources were all that were left of the old world. Each team had to bring all the salvage to their "salvage dump" before the other team did. Players earned points for placing salvage on their team's salvage dump, for stealing enemy salvage, and for simply killing the enemy.

=== Mercia: Fractured Realms ===
Mercia: Fractured Realms was PlayStation Home's first free-to-play role-playing game (RPG). The game "[opened] up the possibility for huge worlds and a depth of narrative that [had] yet to be explored on the platform." It had a detailed XP system and rewards. Players could explore the world and dungeons, fight beasts, collect items, and complete quests. Players could also discover the Guardians who guided them on their journey. The game was developed by Lockwood Publishing and released on 30 August 2012, in Europe and North America.

=== Home Tycoon ===
Home Tycoon was Home's first 3D city-building game developed by Hellfire Games. Home Tycoon, similar to the RollerCoaster Tycoon and Zoo Tycoon games, allowed users to create their own city from the ground up, explore it at street level as their own avatar, and share it with friends. The game also featured a large variety of story-driven missions and activities, vehicle driving, and over 50 avatar rewards to unlock. Users assumed the role as the newly elected mayor, in which they gathered resources and brokered strategic business deals to kick-start their town's economy. There were over 60 unlockable buildings throughout the game, and users could craft and personalize their city with apartment buildings, luxury homes, public parks, power plants, research hospitals, police stations, and other structures.

=== Intellivision Gen2 ===
Intellivision Productions, Inc. announced on 14 September 2012, that it would be bringing three "classic games" from the Intellivision game console to PlayStation Home as Intellivision Gen2, released in fall 2012. The games featured were Astrosmash, Shark! Shark!, and Night Stalker, which had been upgraded while staying true to the originals' looks and game play. The development team stated they were "enhanced yet completely faithful conversions." The developers also stated that they added some features that they would have liked to have added in the original versions. Astrosmash Gen2 featured more types of UFOs, more pronounced difficulty level progressions, and base weapon power-ups in comparison to the original. With Shark! Shark! Gen2, in addition to players being a fish eating other fish trying try to take down the shark, their food and foes both swam in a wide variety of new patterns. Night Stalker Gen2 was still filled with bats and spiders, but it had a greater variety of killer robots, each more challenging to confront, along with a variety of maze structures.

=== Other games ===
Other, less prominent PlayStation Home exclusive games include Dragon's Green, fantasy mini-golf game; Conspiracy, Home's first third-person shooter game; Slap Happy Sam; PlayStation Home Hold 'em; Sports Trivia; RC Rally; Bootleggers '29; Cutthroats: Battle for Black Powder Cove; Clusterpuck; and many more.

== Events ==
Home hosted many types of events organised by Home and its affiliated content providers. Live events such as developer interviews, E3, sports, and concerts were broadcast. Special events were generally held at one (or multiple) of the PlayStation Events Spaces in-game.

The first events in Home required the users to either answer questions or suggest ideas on the Official PlayStation Home Forums for a chance to win a prize. The prize was generally a US$10 product voucher for virtual items in the shopping complex. These events were organised by the PlayStation Home Managers.

Some events were used to promote and advertise upcoming films. In 2009 in Europe, there was a treasure hunt occurring in Home to promote the film Transformers: Revenge of the Fallen.

There were some events in Home where users could win PS3 games. US users in the North American Home had the chance to win the Uncharted 2: Among Thieves – Fortune Hunter Edition by entering the Uncharted 2 space between the event times and playing the "Mask Mayhem" mini-game. The user who placed first on the leader board in the Uncharted 2 space received the Fortune Hunter Edition. Users also had three chances during November 2009 to win the Uncharted 2: Among Thieves – Fortune Hunter Edition.

The first live-streaming event for PlayStation Home was NASA's final launch of Space Shuttle Discovery. This event occurred on 24 February 2011, at 4:50 pm EST. Users could watch the live stream from their (or their friends) Sunset Yacht (formerly Amaterasu Yacht) personal space.

From 29 July through 31, 2011, the EVO World Finals were streamed live in North America's theatre. This stream was also used to test a new streaming method for Home. Rewards were given each day with the final reward, a virtual replica trophy of the EVO Championship Trophy.

In the European and North American Home, the Home management teams set up days for users to meet up and launch the featured game of the night. For example, in the North American Home, there was a Resistance 2: SRPA Siege Night, which occurred every Friday from 6 pm PT to 10 pm PT. The North American Home had a Featured Game Night where online multi-player games had been pre-selected in advance to be featured every night of the month for users to meet up in Home and launch into the featured game of the night.

== Security ==
A variety of potentially offensive words and word combinations were automatically censored in messages that were typed in any chat channel, be it public, private, group, or club chat. Users were able to report inappropriate or offensive behavior of other users to moderators by accessing the PlayStation Home Safe Screen. Moderators reviewed these reports periodically, and took action against a user's account based on the type and severity of the offense. A limited number of live moderators also patrolled PlayStation Home, who had the ability to take action against users immediately. These moderators were often invisible to other users, and typically would not type in public chat. Suspensions and bans were made against a user's PSN account, and restricted their ability not only to use PlayStation Home, but any other online service on PSN. Users were also able to change their communication settings to block or mute messages from users who were not on their friends list.

== Updates ==
PlayStation Home underwent weekly maintenance on Wednesdays (formerly Thursdays), which came with weekly content updates that included new spaces, games, or items. The core updates provided bug fixes and expanded the social and gameplay aspects of Home. The beta received several updates that included giving the users the ability to access the patio of their Harbour Studio, to access the 'Menu Pad', and to access the shopping complex. After location-affecting updates, the location had to be re-downloaded. Content updates did not affect the version number, while core client updates affected the version number.

=== Key version updates ===
- Version 1.03 was the first open beta version and was released on 11 December 2008. The Home icon automatically appeared under the PlayStation Network category on the XMB.
- Version 1.50, released on 20 April 2011, introduced real-time multiplayer, improved physics and graphics, and greater control over collision detection as part of a suite of new technology that developers could use to create connected gaming experiences. Also with v1.5 were more avatar save slots (24), new facial building features, better furniture management, various graphical tweaks to the Navigator, improved object placement options within the personal space, and increased chat log options.
- Version 1.60, released on 8 December 2011, increased furniture limit in personal spaces and clubhouses from 50 to 100 items, allowing 4 active items to be placed. The update also improved targeting in personal spaces. Portable items and companions were made to automatically reactivate after entering and leaving games and spaces. A new help system was also introduced to help beginners. The 3-minute inactivity timeout for arcade games was removed, along with the "Community" option under Options in the Menu Pad. Additional tools were also added for developers to enable them to make better games.
- Version 1.65, released on 25 April 2012, replaced the Menu Pad with a new simplified Menu Screen, added adjustments to the furniture slot memory, enhanced visual display of available memory use, and added a new Voice Chat system that replaced the personal call function. Alerts were also made to integrate better, and the ability to shop from the Wardrobe was added. The cross-game invite system was expanded, and the stability of real time games was improved.
- Version 1.70, released on 12 September 2012, included new features for the camera (an added e-mote), changes to commerce to make it easier to shop, and new functionality for animated portable items. New improvements included an update to the ignore and block function, a new private message sound effect, and general stability improvements.
- Version 1.86, released 12 March 2014, included the addition of trophies to be earned for PlayStation Home.
- Version 1.87 was released immediately after the closure of the service on 1 April 2015. When users try to start Home, two images appear, which states that PlayStation Home is closed, it thanks the 41 million users worldwide who accessed Home over its lifetime, and lists some of the developers that created content for Home.

== Room for PlayStation Portable ==
Room for PSP, a cancelled service that was to be similar to PlayStation Home, was in development for the PlayStation Portable. Officially spelled as R∞M, it was being beta-tested in Japan. It was to be added to the PSP in an update and could have been launched directly from the PlayStation Network section of the XMB. Just like in Home, PSP owners would have been able to invite other PSP owners into their rooms to "enjoy real time communication." A closed beta test began in Q4 2009 in Japan. Development of Room halted on 15 April 2010.

== PlayStation Home Arcade ==
PlayStation Home Arcade is an application for the PlayStation Vita featuring games that were previously only available as arcade cabinets inside PS Home. Once purchased, games can be used on either platform at no additional cost. Icebreaker, WipEout 2D, and a demo of Scribble Shooter are included with the application for free.

=== Games ===
Title	Release date
Icebreaker	5 February 2013
WipEout 2D	5 February 2013
Scribble Shooter	5 February 2013
Frogger	5 February 2013
Time Pilot	5 February 2013
Asteroids	5 February 2013
Centipede	5 February 2013
Astrosmash Gen2	5 February 2013
Shark! Shark! Gen2	5 February 2013
Mad Blocker	5 February 2013

== Restoration project ==
Following the closure of PlayStation Home back in 2015, fans began the preservation project of reverse engineering old home data in an effort to bring the closed platform back online with full functionality. On 28 March 2021 IGN released an article about one such project, "Destination Home", and then a follow up two years later.

== See also ==
- Metaverse
- Second Life
- SAPARi
- IMVU
- OLIVE
- Active Worlds
- There
- Tower Unite
