= List of Disgaea video games =

List of Disgaea video games contains a list of games in the Disgaea (ディスガイア, Disugaia) video game series of tactical role-playing games created and developed by Nippon Ichi. The series debuted in Japan on January 30, 2003, with Disgaea: Hour of Darkness, later re-released as Disgaea: Afternoon of Darkness and Disgaea DS. One of Nippon Ichi's most popular franchises, it has branched off into both a manga and light novel series, as well as an anime. The Disgaea games take place in a fictional universe called the Netherworld and are known for their uncommon RPG elements, such as complex gameplay, extremely high maximum stats, a maximum level of 9999, and humorous, frequently referential dialogue. Main characters in the series often include cynical, power-hungry antiheroes forced to fight alongside heroic foils, much to their disdain. Games in the Disgaea series have been critically acclaimed and received multiple awards.

== Main series ==
Game	Original release date			
Game	Japan	North America	Europe	Australia
Disgaea: Hour of Darkness	January 30, 2003	August 27, 2003	May 28, 2004	2004
Notes: Released for the PlayStation 2; Re-released for PlayStation Portable as Disgaea: Afternoon of Darkness.; Re-released for Nintendo DS as Disgaea DS.; Re-released for PC as Disgaea PC.; Re-released for Nintendo Switch and PlayStation 4 as Disgaea 1 Complete.; Re-released for Android and iOS as Disgaea 1 Complete.
Disgaea 2: Cursed Memories	February 23, 2006	August 29, 2006	November 3, 2006	November 23, 2006
Notes: Released for the PlayStation 2.; Re-released for PlayStation Portable as Disgaea 2: Dark Hero Days.; Re-released for PC as Disgaea 2 PC.
Disgaea 3: Absence of Justice	January 31, 2008	August 26, 2008	February 20, 2009	March 5, 2009
Notes: Released for the PlayStation 3.; Re-released for PlayStation Vita as Disgaea 3: Absence of Detention.
Disgaea 4: A Promise Unforgotten	February 24, 2011	September 6, 2011	October 28, 2011	November 24, 2011
Notes: Released for the PlayStation 3.; Re-released for PlayStation Vita as Disgaea 4: A Promise Revisited.; Re-released for Nintendo Switch, PlayStation 4 and PC as Disgaea 4 Complete+.
Disgaea D2: A Brighter Darkness	March 20, 2013	October 8, 2013	September 27, 2013	October 3, 2013
Notes: Released for the PlayStation 3.; Direct sequel to Disgaea: Hour of Darkness.
Disgaea 5: Alliance of Vengeance	March 26, 2015	October 6, 2015	October 16, 2015	Q4 2015
Notes: Released for the PlayStation 4.; Re-released for Nintendo Switch and PC as Disgaea 5 Complete.
Disgaea 6: Defiance of Destiny	January 28, 2021	June 29, 2021		July 6, 2021
Notes: Released for the Nintendo Switch (and PlayStation 4 outside of the West).; Re-released for PC, PlayStation 4 and PlayStation 5 as Disgaea 6 Complete.
Disgaea 7: Vows of the Virtueless	January 26, 2023	October 3, 2023	October 6, 2023	October 13, 2023
Notes: Released for the PC, Nintendo Switch, PlayStation 4 and PlayStation 5.

== Spin-off titles ==
Game	Details
Mugen Keitai Disgaea Original release date(s): JP: May 25, 2004	Release years by system: 2004 – Mobile phone
Mugen Keitai Disgaea Original release date(s): JP: May 25, 2004	Notes: Mobile phone game; Only released in Japan
Makai Kingdom: Chronicles of the Sacred Tome Original release date(s): JP: March 17, 2005; NA: July 26, 2005; EU: October 25, 2005	Release years by system: 2005 – PlayStation 2
Makai Kingdom: Chronicles of the Sacred Tome Original release date(s): JP: March 17, 2005; NA: July 26, 2005; EU: October 25, 2005	Notes: Set in a different Netherworld
Prinny: Can I Really Be the Hero? Original release date(s): JP: November 20, 2008; NA: February 17, 2009; EU: June 26, 2009	Release years by system: 2008 – PlayStation Portable; 2020 – Nintendo Switch
Prinny: Can I Really Be the Hero? Original release date(s): JP: November 20, 2008; NA: February 17, 2009; EU: June 26, 2009	Notes: A 2D side-scrolling hack and slash game; Was re-released for Nintendo Switch.
Disgaea Infinite Original release date(s): JP: November 1, 2009; NA: June 8, 2010; EU: November 17, 2010	Release years by system: 2009 – PlayStation Portable
Disgaea Infinite Original release date(s): JP: November 1, 2009; NA: June 8, 2010; EU: November 17, 2010	Notes: A visual novel.
Prinny 2: Dawn of Operation Panties, Dood! Original release date(s): JP: March 25, 2010; NA: January 11, 2011; EU: December 15, 2010	Release years by system: 2010 – PlayStation Portable; 2020 – Nintendo Switch
Prinny 2: Dawn of Operation Panties, Dood! Original release date(s): JP: March 25, 2010; NA: January 11, 2011; EU: December 15, 2010	Notes: A 2D side-scrolling hack and slash game; Was re-released for Nintendo Switch.
Disgaea: Netherworld Unbound Original release date(s): JP: May 16, 2011	Release years by system: 2011 – Android
Disgaea: Netherworld Unbound Original release date(s): JP: May 16, 2011	Notes: A free-to-play spinoff based on the first Disgaea's Item World gameplay. While the download and playing are free, NISA confirmed that the North American version would operate on microtransactions for more characters and items, like the Japanese counterpart; NIS America later announced cancellation of plans to localize the game due to technical reasons.; Only released in Japan
Disgaea RPG Original release date(s): JP: March 19, 2019; NA: April 12, 2021	Release years by system: March 19, 2019 – Android, iOS
Disgaea RPG Original release date(s): JP: March 19, 2019; NA: April 12, 2021	Notes: A free to play spin-off title developed by Nippon Icchi and ForwardWorks. It includes all the protagonist and heroines of Disgaea series.; The game was relaunched in November 2019 due to technical reasons.; The Western release was published by Boltrend Games.
Disgaea Mayhem Original release date(s): JP: January 29, 2026; WW: July 23, 2026	Release years by system: 2026 – PlayStation 5, Nintendo Switch, Nintendo Switch 2, Windows
Disgaea Mayhem Original release date(s): JP: January 29, 2026; WW: July 23, 2026	Notes: Released in Japan as Makaism: Frenzy of the Netherworld; A 3D hack and slash action RPG

== See also ==
- Makai Senki Disgaea, an anime adaptation of the series
