= Yuko Sasamoto =

Japanese voice actress

Yūko Sasamoto
- 笹本 優子
- Born: January 30, 1973 (age 53)
- Occupation: Voice actress

Yuko Sasamoto (笹本 優子, Sasamoto Yūko; born January 30, 1973) is a Japanese voice actress.

== Filmography ==
=== Anime ===
- Cyborg Kuro-chan (1999) – Pooly, Nyan Nyan Army No. 2/Spyder, Lily
- Hamtaro (2000) – Mimi (Momo Iwata)
- Gate Keepers (2000) – Ayako Isagai
- Kirby: Right Back at Ya! (2001) – Princess Rona
- Little Snow Fairy Sugar (2001) – Jan
- Super GALS! Kotobuki Ran (2001) – Kasumi Tsukino
- Chrono Crusade (2003) – Shader
- Mobile Suit Gundam SEED Destiny (2004) – Conille Almeta
- Elemental Gelade (2005) – Rerea
- Fushigiboshi no Futagohime (2005) – Nacchi
- Disgaea (2006) – Flonne
- Ouran High School Host Club (2006) – Hinako Tsuwabuki
- Les Misérables: Shōjo Cosette (2007) – Éponine
- Major: Yūjō no Winning Shot (2008) – Kaoru
- Yo-kai Watch (2014) – Meramelion, Robonyan, Gabunyan, Orochi
- Major 2nd (2018–20) – Kaoru Shigeno

=== Video games ===
- Street Fighter: The Movie (1995) – Chun-Li, Cammy
- Street Fighter Zero 2 (1996) – Sakura Kasugano
- Super Puzzle Fighter II X (1996) – Sakura Kasugano
- Marvel Super Heroes vs. Street Fighter (1997) – Sakura Kasugano, Kei Chitose
- Pocket Fighter (1997) – Sakura Kasugano, Kei Chitose
- Rival Schools: United by Fate (1997) – Sakura Kasugano
- Street Fighter Zero 3 (1998) – Sakura Kasugano
- Marvel vs. Capcom 2: New Age of Heroes (2000) – Sakura Kasugano, Kei Chitose
- Capcom vs. SNK: Millennium Fight 2000 (2000) – Sakura Kasugano
- Street Fighter EX3 (2000) – Sakura Kasugano
- Capcom vs. SNK 2: Millionaire Fighting 2001 (2001) – Sakura Kasugano
- Capcom Fighting Jam (2004) – Sakura Kasugano
- Namco × Capcom (2005) – Sakura Kasugano, Hoover (Baby Head)
- Tales of Innocence (2007) – Iria Animi
- Tales of the Rays (2017) – Iria Animi
- Disgaea RPG (2019) – Flonne

Unknown date

- Disgaea: Hour of Darkness – Flonne
- Disgaea 2: Cursed Memories – Flonne, Masked Woman
- Disgaea 3: Absence of Justice – Flonne
- Makai Kingdom – Flonne
- Phantom Brave – Flonne
- Trinity Universe – Flonne

=== Drama CDs ===
- GetBackers (xxxx) – Gabriel
- Soul Eater (xxxx) – Blair

=== Dubbing ===
- Fast Food Nation – Alice (Avril Lavigne)
