= Makai Wars =

2018 mobile video game

- Developer: Nippon Ichi Software
- Publisher: Nippon Ichi Software
- Composer: Tenpei Sato
- Series: Disgaea
- Platforms: Android; iOS
- Release: 15 February 2018
- Genre: Strategy RPG

Makai Wars was a mobile video game released by Nippon Ichi for Android and iOS in 2018. It was originally planned for the PlayStation 3 video game console and the PlayStation Portable.

== History ==
Makai Wars was announced at E3 2004 as an upcoming strategy RPG for the PlayStation Portable. However, no new information surfaced about it for several months until it was announced as having been put on hold in 2005. Later that year, at the 2005 Tokyo Game Show, it was announced that Makai Wars would be released for the PlayStation 3. However, no new information surfaced, and the game was assumed to be cancelled or indefinitely postponed until Nippon Ichi trademarked the title in 2010. In May 2013, in an interview with Famitsu NIS president Sohei Shinkawa said that for NIS 20th anniversary they may show a glimpse of Makai Wars.

On August 22, 2022, it was announced that the game would shut down its live service on October 21.

== Legacy ==
In the 2005 Nippon Ichi title Makai Kingdom: Chronicles of the Sacred Tome, Asagi, who was to be the main character of Makai Wars, made a cameo appearance, breaking the fourth wall to introduce herself as the main character of the next Nippon Ichi game. After that, with the game indefinitely postponed, its vaporware status became a running joke in future Nippon Ichi games, with many of their games (especially ones in the Disgaea series) henceforth featuring Asagi in a cameo role, where she would typically break the fourth wall again to lament the fact that her game was never released.

The pamphlet for Makai Wars given away at E3 2004 featured silhouettes of what appeared to be monster designs, and some of these unused designs were later used in Disgaea 2: Cursed Memories and future games in the Disgaea series.
