= Prinny =

- Disgaea character
- A Prinny as seen in the Disgaea series.
- First game: Disgaea: Hour of Darkness (2003)
- Voiced by: Grant George (Disgaea: Hour of Darkness and Disgaea 4: A Promise Unforgotten); Sam Riegel (Disgaea 7: Vows of the Virtueless); Junji Majima (Japanese)

Prinnies (プリニー, Purinī) are a fictional race of creatures primarily in Nippon Ichi's Disgaea series of role-playing games. First appearing in Disgaea: Hour of Darkness, they have appeared in all later titles by the company, as well as on various merchandise such as hats and plush toys. With a few notable exceptions, they are voiced by Junji Majima in Japanese releases and Grant George in the English releases from Disgaea: Hour of Darkness to Disgaea 4: A Promise Unforgotten. The Prinnies are regarded as the mascots for the Disgaea series and have received generally positive reception.

== Concept and creation ==
The Prinny was created by Takehito Harada while he was trying to come up with a character whose thoughts players could not try to envision. He began by choosing to make it animal-based, eventually deciding on making something similar to a penguin. He was told that he could use this character as much as he wanted. While it initially started out as looking somewhat realistic, it eventually gained a doll-like form.

== Appearances ==
A prinny is a small, usually blue, pouch-wearing penguin-like creature with disproportionately small bat wings, two peg legs where feet would normally be, and stitches at the top of the chest. When thrown, they explode on impact. A common trait of prinnies is their upbeat attitude and tendency to end their sentences with "-ssu". In the English translation, they frequently use "dood" as an interjection. Prinnies stand roughly 1 m (3 ft 3 in) tall, though the weight can vary. Prinnies attack with knives, bombs, and occasionally other weapons stored in their bags. While rarely mentioned in the game, prinnies have been known to dispense a beverage known as prinny juice, which according to a Nippon Ichi Software America interview is produced from "the most flavorful and delicious parts of our fresh, vine-grown Prinnies".

In Disgaea: Hour of Darkness, humans who have led a worthless life, such as thieves or murderers, or have committed a mortal sin such as suicide, have their souls sewn into the body of a prinny upon their death. Due to the unstable soul of a human, regular prinnies will explode when they hit something with great force, such as when thrown. However, Prinny suits filled with demon souls, as seen in Makai Kingdom or in the case of recurring boss Baal, will not. After being reborn, the newly created prinny will serve as a soldier, slave, or servant in the Netherworld or Celestia. The prinny remains until it has earned reincarnation by redemption through good deeds or earning enough money, and leaves its servitude in a ritual involving the Red Moon. In Celestia, prinnies mostly act as maids and domestic servants. The good deeds they perform there lead to their reincarnation. In the Netherworld, depending on the lord they serve, they spend their difficult after-lives doing excessively hard labor for very little pay, and are often thrown around just for the amusement of their lords. The pittance of money they earn in the Netherworld goes towards their reincarnation.

Some prinnies live in Prinny Land, their own world in which prinnies do not explode when thrown. Some prinnies flee there to escape their lives in the Netherworld, and some may have rebelled or have been banished there. Another place prinnies can be found is the Land of Carnage. These prinnies live for battle and look down on newcomers. While prinnies manage all shops and such, an old friend can be found here too. Prinny Kurtis makes a comeback as a Land of Carnage only character. The player can summon Kurtis with cell phones and pass some bills from the Earth Defense Forces to aid him, it is not needed to gain access to Kurtis. In the Land of Carnage, the prinnies call warriors who fight hundreds of thousands of battles "Shura." Rumor has it, there is a prinny who has lived in the Land of Carnage longer than anyone else and is the master of the land.

Prinnies have appeared in almost every major Nippon Ichi video game; their first appearance was in the game Disgaea: Hour of Darkness. Prinnies follow a ranking system, starting at Private Prinny and moving up to Prinny God. The "Uber Prinny", which is the prinny form of Baal, cannot be utilized by players. Prinnies are usually under Etna's control. In Disgaea 2: Cursed Memories they lead the Dark Court and are responsible for judging the party's crimes, of which a guilty verdict will always be passed. In general the felonies applied by the Dark Court are to the player's benefit but if one wants to remove them from a character for various reasons then the character must reincarnate as a Prinny to atone for their sins. Unlike most other incarnations, prinny gods do not have immunity to status effects. In Disgaea 3: Absence of Justice, a special Prinny under the title Hero Prinny appears as part of special downloadable content. The Hero Prinny claims that he has come to make a guest appearance from Prinny: Can I Really Be The Hero?, but Mao doesn't believe him. It ends up that Mao defeats and captures Hero Prinny, and turns him into a hero. The Hero Prinny then becomes playable. Prinnies star in their own game Prinny: Can I Really Be the Hero? for the PSP handheld console.

In Makai Kingdom: Chronicles of the Sacred Tome, prinnies are said to possess the soul of a demon, rather than that of a human. Their bodies are manufactured in Ruskan factories, located in another dimension, by inventor demons. In order to create Prinny units in Makai Kingdom, the player must first make a wish to create Prinnies in The Sacred Tome. Then the first Prinny class will become available to create. The weaponry available to a prinny is expanded to include expertise with shovels and wrenches. The Prinnies do not explode when thrown. Prinnies appear in Phantom Brave, which does not use a subclass system, and are able to use all weapon types, but have a smaller role in the game's plot. Pringer X serves as the final challenge of the bonus storyline. Phantom Brave's Prinnies cause explosions upon being summoned or unsummoned, these explosions do not injure the Prinny itself. Airborne prinnies make an appearance in Tori no Hoshi: Aerial Planet, a game similar to Pilotwings, used to add a "Nippon Ichi flavor" to the title. The crossover role playing game Cross Edge features a prinny and Etna. They also appeared in Trinity Universe, a crossover game with characters from Idea Factory, Nippon Ichi, and Gust Corporation. Nippon Ichi's characters include the Prinny as well as Etna and Flonne. A giant Prinny appeared as a special attack in the company-collaborative RPG, Hyperdimension Neptunia Mk2, where the in-game character Nisa (named Nippon Ichi in the Japanese version) throws a bunch of kunais at enemies, then throws the giant Prinny at the enemies, which results in a nuclear bomb type explosion. Nisa is also designed to resemble a Prinny. A Prinny cap is unlockable in the 3D remake of the 2004 Cave Story, published by Nippon Ichi Software. Prinny also appear in the PS3 Exclusive title Last Rebellion as optional bosses to be faced in the final mirror when entered as Nine.

=== In other media ===
A Prinny appeared in a Penny Arcade comic strip on September 4, 2006. A Prinny also appeared as a recurring character in Fred Perry's LvlUp! comic series.

== Promotion and reception ==
Prinnies are regarded as mascots for the Disgaea series, featuring strongly in Nippon Ichi's marketing such as the annual Tipsy Prinny press events. The third event, held in the Zebulon Bar San Francisco on June 5, 2008, featured green Prinnies suspended from every banister and light fitting. Nippon Ichi Software's online store sells various merchandise such as several different Prinny plushies, and in Japan Nippon Ichi has released several pieces of Prinny merchandise and has used the characters in cosplay to promote the release of Prinny: Can I Really be the Hero? in Akihabara. A Prinny stylus was featured as a pre-order bonus for people who pre-ordered Disgaea DS. Additionally four Prinny avatars for the PlayStation 3's PlayStation Home were also released for sale, modeled after the different unique Prinnies in the original Disgaea.

Prinnies have been described as one of the most notable characters in the Disgaea series. RPGamer called them the "much-adored penguin mascots" of Disgaea, while Wired.com called them "adorably snarky". IGN editor Dave McCarthy praised Disgaea 3: Absence of Justice's humour, citing the Prinnies as an example. In a preview of the upcoming game starting the character in PlayStation: The Official Magazine, Chris Hudak asked "What better sign that you've warmed the cold hearts of videogamers worldwide than to have your own beloved, signature character?", additionally comparing in great detail the Prinny to fellow video game mascots Mario, Sonic the Hedgehog, and Dragon Quest's Slime. PSX Extreme described them as "one of the most recognizable – and curiously lovable – characters" in the Disgaea series. Webcomic Penny Arcade featured a Prinny in their comic to mark the release of Disgaea 2, adding in the commentary "You've probably heard that penguins are great fathers or whatever, you saw that Goddamn penguin movie and you bought into their whole thing. When faced with one of these hideous creatures, there is only one recourse: be stern for two panels, and then give in." GamesRadar listed the Prinny as one of the 25 best new characters of the decade, describing it as "heartwarmingly pathetic", calling the act of creating an army of "nigh-invulnerable Prinny wimps" is one of the greatest accomplishments in role-playing games. They also listed it as one of the most impractical video game characters, describing it as "incredibly stupid".
