= Makai Senki Disgaea =

Anime television series

- Logo for Makai Senki Disgaea

魔界戦記ディスガイア
- Genre: Fantasy, Comedy
- Anime television series
- Directed by: Kiyotaka Isako
- Produced by: Kazuya Furuse; Rika Sasaki; Jun Nishimura; Shuhei Arakawa
- Written by: Atsuhiro Tomioka
- Music by: Tenpei Sato
- Studio: OLM Team Iguchi
- Licensed by: Crunchyroll: UK: MVM Films
- Original network: CBC
- Original run: April 4, 2006 – June 20, 2006
- Episodes: 12
- Manga
- Written by: Takehito Harada, Arashi Shindo
- Illustrated by: Arashi Shindo
- Published by: Ichijinsha
- English publisher: Broccoli Books
- Magazine: Monthly Comic Zero Sum
- Published: 2003
- Volumes: 1
- Manga

Makai Senki Disgaea 2
- Written by: Takehito Harada, Hekaton
- Illustrated by: Hekaton
- Published by: MediaWorks
- English publisher: Broccoli Books
- Magazine: Dengeki Maoh
- Original run: 2006 – 2007
- Volumes: 4
- Manga

Makai Senki Disgaea 3: School of Devils
- Written by: Shin Sasaki
- Published by: Enterbrain
- Magazine: Famitsu Comic Clear
- Original run: May 29, 2009 – December 3, 2010
- Volumes: 2
- Novel series
- Written by: Akikura Junna
- Illustrated by: Takehito Harada
- Published by: MediaWorks
- Volumes: 2
- Novel series
- Written by: Sow Kamashiro
- Illustrated by: Takehito Harada, Chou Niku
- Published by: Enterbrain
- Imprint: Famitsu Bunko
- Original run: 2003 – present
- Volumes: 9
- Novel series

Makai Senki Disgaea 2
- Written by: Aso Ryou
- Illustrated by: Hekaton
- Published by: Enterbrain
- Imprint: Famitsu Bunko
- Volumes: 4
- Novel series

Makai Senki Disgaea 3
- Written by: Sow Kamashiro
- Illustrated by: Chou Niku
- Published by: Enterbrain
- Imprint: Famitsu Bunko
- Original run: 2008 – present
- Volumes: 3

Makai Senki Disgaea (魔界戦記ディスガイア, Makai Senki Disugaia; "Netherworld Battle Chronicle Disgaea") is an anime series based on the video game Disgaea: Hour of Darkness. Makai Senki Disgaea follows the same general plot as the game, but with several alterations to characters and chronology. The anime was licensed by Geneon Entertainment before they closed their doors in 2007. On September 1, 2010, North American anime distributor Funimation announced that they had rescued the series, and they released the complete series in 2011.

A bonus feature on the DVD of Disgaea 2: Cursed Memories was a trailer of what the Disgaea anime would look like. However, the anime turned out to be completely different from what was shown in the trailer. No explanation was given for the drastic departure of the final anime from the trailer. A preview of the Disgaea anime was also available on another Geneon anime DVD, Hellsing Ultimate OVA I.

Makai Senki Disgaea is also the title of several distinct manga and light novel series based on the Disgaea game series.

== Plot ==
An angel apprentice Flonne is sent from her homeland of Celestia to the Netherworld with a mission to assassinate King Krichevskoy, the ruler of the Netherworld. However, when she arrives at King Krichevskoy's castle, it is engulfed in flames, and he is nowhere to be found. For the next two years, Flonne searches for King Krichevskoy, eventually narrowing her search to a local dump. She finds a coffin with Krichevskoy's emblem on it and tries to carry out the assassination. However, it turns out that it is not Krichevskoy inside, but his son Laharl. After learning that his father has died, Laharl sets out to claim the title of overlord for himself. Flonne and a demon by the name of Etna followed after him, joining him on his journey's.

== Main characters ==
Laharl
Voiced by: Kaori Mizuhashi (Japanese); Barbara Goodson (English)
Two years after the death of his father, King Krichevskoy, Laharl was awakened with the ambition to become the next Overlord of the Netherworld. Laharl is an extremely self-centered individual and insists that he is evil with great fervor, but he occasionally fails to hide his compassion, invariably leading to much teasing on the part of his vassals, Etna in particular. Laharl is very insecure with his emotions and believes that they are signs of a weakness that Demons should not have. As such, he always responds to his vassal's taunts with an adamant refusal of any kindness in his heart, usually accompanied by a rather unneeded show of force. Despite his rather slim and childlike frame, Laharl possesses immense physical strength, as well as powerful magic, and often displays his power in excess to enforce his authority over his vassals, intimidate his opponents, or when he's outraged. He is ruthless in battle and thinks nothing of the life of his opponent until they are at his mercy. He also has an irrational fear of attractive women. In the end, Laharl starts to understand what Flonne meant by love. When she is turned into a flower as punishment by Seraph Lamington, Laharl gives up his life. He is then reincarnated as a Prinny.
Flonne
Voiced by: Yuko Sasamoto (Japanese); Sandy Fox (English)
Flonne is an angel apprentice from the angel populated land Celestia and a strong believer of love. She is sent to the Netherworld by Seraph Lamington, the ruler of Celestia, to assassinate King Krichevskoy, only to find out that he is already deceased. When she meets Laharl and learns of his refusal to believe in love, she becomes Laharl's follower in order to find the good in him. She is portrayed as naive and often clueless. She often worries about other characters, but doesn't hesitate to take down a necessary opponent.
Etna
Voiced by: Tomoe Hanba (Japanese); Michelle Ruff (English)
Etna is Laharl's subordinate. Though she seems to serve him faithfully, she has her own secret agenda. She previously served the late King Krichevskoy. Though she made a promise to the king to protect Laharl, she doesn't respect him as a superior. She herself desires to be the Overlord. However, she was extremely reluctant to assume the role of Overlord when Laharl named her as his successor before destroying his existence to save Flonne.
Vyers
Voiced by: Chihiro Suzuki (Japanese); Grant George (English)
Vyers is a self-proclaimed "rival" of Laharl. He calls himself "The Count of Beauty" or "Dark Adonis", but Laharl and others refer to him simply as "Mid Boss", much to his chagrin. He seems to know when and where to appear whenever Laharl is in a jam or when he simply wants to challenge Laharl. It is hinted that he could possibly be Laharl's father.
Prinnies
Voiced by: Junji Majima (Japanese); Grant George (English)
Prinnies are human souls sewn into penguin-like beings with demon wings and pouches. They do hard labor for very little pay as punishment for the evil deeds they have done on Earth. Etna hires an army of Prinnies who tend not to listen to her until she threatens to hurt them, although she often does so anyway.
Seraph Lamington
Voiced by: Junji Majima (Japanese); Jamieson Price (English)
Seraph Lamington is the kind soft-spoken leader of Celestia. He is the angel responsible for sending Flonne down to the Netherworld to assassinate King Krichevskoy. He never raises his voice even when giving out orders.
Captain Gordon
Voiced by: Nobuo Tobita (Japanese); Michael McConnohie (English)
Captain Gordon is the 37th Defender of Earth. He has an assistant named Jennifer and a robot named Thursday, and with them he explores space and captures evil doers, criminals, and demons. He is very loyal to angels even going as far as bowing and kneeling for them, but demons are automatically considered targets by him.
Jennifer
Voiced by: Chiwa Saito (Japanese); Paula Tiso (English)
Jennifer is Captain Gordon's assistant. She is a scientist with a Ph.D, and is Thursday's creator. She joins Captain Gordon in exploring space and capturing criminals.
Thursday
Voiced by: Yurika Ochiai (Japanese); Bob Papenbrook (English)
Thursday is the robotic member of Captain Gordon's team. He is the information station of the group, responsible for analyzing and fixing things. He can also transform into various weapons. He was created by Jennifer.
Kurtis
Voiced by: Kousuke Toriumi (Japanese); David Lodge (English)
Kurtis is another human from Earth who works under the Earth Defense Force He suffered a traumatic experience, in which a group of terrorists destroyed the building where he and his family were in.

== Theme songs ==
Opening theme: "Aishitageru" (愛したげる)

- Performed by: LOVERIN TAMBURIN
- Lyrics and composition by: aya.
- Arrangement by: AKIHIRO

Ending theme: "Kusari" (鎖り)

- Vocals and composition by: Akiko Kawakami
- Lyrics by: Hiiro Misaki
- Arrangement by: Katsu Takahashi

== Episode list ==
No.	Title	Original release date
1	"The Sleeping Prince in the Garbage Dump" "Nemureru Gomi Suteba no Ouji" (眠れるゴミ捨て場の王子)	April 4, 2006
Flonne descends from the heavens as an angel apprentice into a demon tomb to awaken the demon prince named Laharl. The two must embark on a journey to have Laharl reclaim his rightful position as the overlord of the Netherworld. They are stopped by lion demons, who try to prevent this from happening. As a spaceship crashes into the tomb, the two soon encounter Captain Gordon, Jennifer, and Thursday, who all mistake Laharl as a wanted demon. As the tomb is destroyed, Flonne loses her pendant that carries her strength, unknowingly found by Thursday. Laharl defeats a lion demon who had previous survived.
2	"Scratch 1 Mid-boss, Add 1 Vassal" "Chuu Bosu Ochite Kerai ga Fueta" (中ボス落ちてケライがふえた)	April 11, 2006
Even though Flonne attempted to release a dragon from her staff, she lays weakened without her pendant. Etna finds Laharl to take him to the castle. Captain Gordon, Jennifer, and Thursday are introduced to the archangel Vulcanus, who has come to retrieve the pendant from them. After Etna summons her squad of prinnies to make some lunch for Laharl, it is then that Captain Gordon, Jennifer, and Thursday attack them, not long before Flonne arrives with Vyers to stop the blast of the cannon. The pendant falls from the sky, but as Vyers tries to claim it, the cliff collapses into a lava pit, yet Laharl deliberately saves the pendant from falling.
3	"Welcome to the Netherworld Hall of Treasures" "Oidemase Makai Hihoukan" (おいでませ魔界秘宝館)	April 18, 2006
As Laharl, Flonne, and Etna continue their travel, the prinnies take them to a giant museum as a place to rest, filled with many artifacts on display. It is revealed that Etna has discreetly announced a bounty on Laharl once he has returned to the Netherworld. At night, strange things begin to happen when a clammed artifact begins to resonate, by fault of Vulcanus. The following day, Laharl sees that Flonne and Etna have assumed opposite roles. Even with the appearances of Captain Gordon, Jennifer, and Thursday are to no help. Vyers tells Flonne and Etna, along with Laharl and a prinny, to enter a dimensional door in order to restore their personalities back to normal.
4	"A Solomon-style Judgement at the Dinero Castle?!" "Narikin-Jou no Oooka Sabaki!?" (成金城の大岡裁き!?)	April 25, 2006
The prinnies go on strike for being unpaid for their workload. Laharl and Eta decide to raid various castles to find the richest demon around, despite the protests from Flonne. The three cross paths with Captain Gordon, Jennifer, and Thursday at a pawn shop, where they come across Laharl's belongings that were taken away from the castle. Laharl is brought in to defeat Zeniski by request of his son Koganeski. However, it is soon realized that Koganeski just wants his father to care for him, instead of being so worried about the wealth. After Laharl sends them to an alternate realm, he contemplates on his relationship with his father King Krichevskoy.
5	"A Dungeon of Temptation...Maybe" "Miwaku no Danjon ... Kamoshirenai" (魅惑のダンジョン...かもしれない)	May 2, 2006
Laharl, while walking in a forest with Etna, finds out about the bounty on his head but has no idea who set it up. Flonne, becoming separate from Laharl and Etna, gets lost in a desert. During a downpour, Laharl and Etna enter an estate, unexpectedly invited for dinner by Saldia, but are deceived when she reveals herself as a demon slayer. Captain Gordon, Jennifer, and Thursday, who all are aware of the bounty, break into the estate. As a countermeasure, Saldia traps them all underground in a cavern. Laharl and Etna find themselves underwater being attack by a shark demon, soon being able to penetrate through the barrier. Saldia finds Flonne outside and tells her of the bounty. Vyers makes his appearance, though using his distraction, Laharl manages to defeat Saldia. Laharl then asks Saldia to show him to the castle to find out who is responsible for putting a bounty on his head.
6	"Etna's Embarrassing Secret" "Etna no Hazukashii hi·mi·tsu" (エトナの恥ずかしいヒ·ミ·ツ)	May 9, 2006
Laharl, Flonne, and Etna find the castle, and they are greeted by Maderas. It turns out that Etna has betrayed Laharl and Flonne, sending them inside a box and shrinking them down in size, forced to play a game of scenarios. However, Maderas fails to give Etna the bounty money as well as her shameful memories. Even when he tells her to toss the box into the fireplace, he continues to blackmail her. It is then realized that Maderas had stored her memories inside a group of prinnies, which urges Etna to free Laharl and Flonne. A choir of cheerful girls are brought out, repeatedly weakening Laharl. Etna unveils that she wanted to become the overlord if Laharl was deceased, but she had fallen prey to the previous schemes of Maderas. After the prinnies release the memories, the three end up outside, and Maderas is locked inside the box.
7	"Netherworld Siblings" "Makai Kyoudai" (魔界兄妹)	May 16, 2006
Laharl, Flonne, and Etna meet with Captain Gordon, Jennifer, and Thursday at a saloon, where it is discovered that Laharl has a little demon sister named Maharl, though Laharl denies this fact. A group of biker empresses are actually after Maharl, but nobody knows the reason why, leading Laharl to become suspicious of her. He plays the role of an older brother, with Flonne and Etna being dragged along. It seems that Maharl is well association with King Krichevskoy, much to the surprise of everyone. The biker empresses capture Maharl, and Flonne is also caught while trying to find her. Even though Laharl and Etna has come to the rescue, it is realized that Maharl is really a doll.
8	"The Prinnie's Longest Day!" "Purini no Ichiban Nagai Hi Ssu!" (プリニーの一番長い日ッス!)	May 23, 2006
The prinnies start a rebellion at town as they make their escape to a floating island. Laharl, Flonne, and Etna disguise themselves as prinnies, but they are soon found out, thanks to Laharl. A stray prinny, later recognized as Big Sis Prinny, guides them to safety into a secret underground base. At night, an irritated Laharl interrupts a prinny ceremony, but is offered as a sacrifice to their deity called the Pringer X, in order to declare themselves a sovereign nation. However, Laharl easily defeats the Pringer X, causing the island to sink.
9	"Space Battleship Gargantua!" "Uchuu Senkan Garuganchuwa!" (宇宙戦艦ガルガンチュワ!)	May 30, 2006
Laharl, Flone, and Etna hitch a ride with Captain Gordon, Jennifer, and Thursday to the castle, in exchange for a duel between Laharl and Captain Gordon. Laharl catches sight of the demon tome, which Captain Gordon kept with him. Once inside the castle, Laharl claims his throne as overlord and activates the demon tome. Thursday sends several satellite signals to the galactic battleship Gargantua, launching a surprise attack at the castle led by General Carter, the adopted father of Jennifer. Captain Gordon is overpowered by his accomplice Kurtis, Jennifer agrees to leave the former and side with the latter, and Flonne and Etna become captured in the process. Laharl, taking on the battleship by himself, is intercepted by Kurtis, who reveals that he was using Captain Gordon as a scapegoat all along, before being thrown onto the ground with Captain Gordon.
10	"The Defender of Tomorrow Is You!" "Ashita no Yuusha ha Kimi da!" (明日の勇者はキミだ!)	June 6, 2006
It is revealed that General Carter, though initially planned to save humanity, instead intended to take over the Netherworld. Flonne and Etna try to escape from the hands of the soldiers, later with the help of the squad of prinnies. Jennifer, who was taken in to see her father, suddenly finds herself confined onto a table. Kurtis reminisces of his traumatic experience five years prior. He and his family were caught in a terrorist attack, in which his wife and daughter were killed, and most of his body was mechanized. The others find that General Carter has installed a brainwashing device on Jennifer, but Kurtis manages to snatch it before he jumps off the battleship. A group of celestial hosts appear and attack Laharl, Flonne, and Etna. However, a panicked General Carter later evacuates to a space vessel, after mentioning that Vulcanus may be behind this whole scheme.
11	"A Night Lit Up by the Red Moon" "Akai Tsuki ga Terasu Yoru" (赤い月が照らす夜)	June 13, 2006
Laharl, Flonne, and Etna set course to Celestia, ending up on a snowfield that crosses over to the red moon. The prinnies have atoned for their sins, as they happily prepare to pass on. Big Sis Prinny tells Flonne of her influence of love toward Laharl, yet Laharl denies this. Etna recalls that Laharl was told by his mother to always treat everyone with love, but he started doing the opposite when his mother sacrificed herself to save his life from a disease. Laharl, not wanting the prinnies to pass on, tries to interfere with the process. It is noticed that Big Sis Prinny is the reincarnation of Laharl's mother, as she says her farewell to the others.
12	"Love... After the Fighting Is Over" "Ai ... Tatakai no Hate ni" (愛...戦いの果てに)	June 20, 2006
Laharl, Flonne, and Etna finally arrive in Celestia, only to be halted by Vulcanus, who surrounds them with several demon warriors. Nevertheless, Laharl forces Vulcanus to retreat after having defeated the warriors. The three then enter the sanctuary, where they encounter Seraph Lamington. After having been convinced by Flonne that Vulcanus has prejudiced views between angels and demons, Seraph Lamington turns Vulcanus into a toad as punishment. Seraph Lamington then reveals that he sent Flonne to awaken Laharl from his slumber induced by poison, all in an attempt to unite Celestia and the Netherworld in a peaceful environment. However, Flonne is turned into a flower as punishment for injuring the celestial hosts who attacked the battleship. After Laharl furiously destroys the sanctuary, he spares Seraph Lamington's life out of love. He sacrifices his life to resurrect Flonne as a demon. Etna claims the title of overlord, and Laharl is reincarnated as a prinny.

== Other Disgaea media ==
- Disgaea novels- A set of novels written by Sow Kanimiso and illustrated by Chou Niku (although they were aided by Takehito Harada in the beginning) These novels begin with a novelization of the first game and then continues the story ten years later. The novels introduce many new characters including Laharl's relatives, Flonne's family, and Gordon and Jennifer's daughter. While it is unknown if the novels are considered canon, it can fit alongside Disgaea and Disgaea 2 in the canon due to the placement of the novel's plot (Disgaea 2 takes place only three years after the game, whereas the Disgaea novels are placed ten years after the first game.) Currently, there are six novels: Enter the Maoh, Revelation, Returned, On Love part 1 and part 2, and Battle of the Maoh (which also feature appearances by Zetta, Pram, Salome, and King Drake from Makai Kingdom) Laharl, Etna, and Flonne also appear in all other Nippon Ichi novels. This includes the Phantom Brave and Makai Kingdom novels. Recently, a novel for Disgaea 2 has been released.
- Disgaea manga- While not necessarily canon, the Disgaea manga illustrated by Arashi Shindo follows the basic storyline. Many events in the manga, while similar, have been altered completely and the humor is a lot more random. (i.e. Laharl, Etna, and Flonne begin to believe that Mid Boss is a pedophile due to his recurring presence among the three) Many characters also appear to have different personalities (i.e. on occasion, Lamington will be seen baking a cake). The art style is also very different as many of the characters appear somewhat more mature and the art is very shōjo-like. Broccoli Books released the manga in September 2006. Disgaea 2 Volume 1 was released February 2007, and the subsequent Volume 2 in July 2007.

== Reception ==
On Anime News Network, Theron Martin gave the anime an overall grade of C−, saying that "on the balance ... this is a wholly forgettable effort."
