= Disgaea Infinite =

2009 video game

- North American box art
- Developer: Nippon Ichi Software
- Publishers: JP: Nippon Ichi Software; WW: NIS America
- Director: Masahiro Yamamoto
- Producer: Sohei Niikawa
- Designer: Masahiro Yamamoto
- Programmers: Sayaka Hori; Nobutaka Koseki; Takehisa Matsuda
- Artist: Takehito Harada (character)
- Writers: Yamazi Machina; Sohei Niikawa; Sayaka Hori
- Composer: Tenpei Sato
- Series: Disgaea
- Platform: PlayStation Portable
- Release: JP: 1 November 2009; NA: 8 June 2010; EU: 17 November 2010
- Genre: Visual novel
- Mode: Single-player

Disgaea Infinite (ディスガイア インフィニット, Disugaia Infinitto) is a visual novel for the PlayStation Portable. The game is part of the Disgaea series, using the same setting and characters as Disgaea: Hour of Darkness, though Mao and Raspberyl from Disgaea 3 also make appearances.

== Plot ==
The player takes on the role of a Prinny (CV: Junji Majima) who is commanded to investigate the attempted "assassination" of overlord Laharl. Disgaea Infinite starts with a travel back into time where the main character will possess other characters to obtain information and gather clues to solve the mysteries.

The game takes place in the Netherworld from Disgaea: Hour of Darkness. As such, several important characters from that realm appear in the game, including Laharl, Etna, Flonne, Prinnies (and the main character Prinny), Jennifer, Captain Gordon, and Thursday. The game also features Mao and Raspberyl from Disgaea 3 as major characters. Asagi also makes a minor appearance in the game's bonus ending.

The game begins with the main character, Prinny, meeting up with Etna, Flonne, and Laharl. Laharl is looking for the Super Rare Pudding that he believes Etna is hiding. While cleaning Laharl's bedroom, he finds a watch item, which is later revealed to be Tick Tock.

== Gameplay ==
The game uses interactive elements, including a magic clock called "TickTock" that allows the Prinny to possess other characters' bodies to solve the mystery. As the player proceeds through the story, possessing different characters will change the point of view the player plays the game from, and often change the route the player takes. In some instances, the possessed character can be mind controlled, which in turn influences the possessed character's decision and may move the story's progress onto a different route.

The player is tasked with altering history by averting the 'assassination' of Laharl by an unknown assailant, which also averts his and all other Prinnys from losing their salaries. By utilizing the TickTock device, the player follows the complex interactions of various characters from the Disgaea series and can use 'mind control' to change specific choices they make, thus changing the way certain interactions take place, and eventually what endings are viewed. There are 14 endings total. The fourteenth is viewed after viewing all the other endings.

A Time Table is provided to aid the player in tracking the complex paths of characters over time and place, and the changes that are available to be made to the timeline.

== Reception ==
Reception

Aggregate score
| Aggregator | Score |
|---|---|
| Metacritic | 64/100 |

Review scores
| Publication | Score |
|---|---|
| 1Up.com | B− |
| Famitsu | 29/40 |
| Game Informer | 6.5/10 |
| GameRevolution | C |
| GamesRadar+ | 3/5 |
| GameTrailers | 7.1/10 |
| GameZone | 6.5/10 |
| Hardcore Gamer | 3/5 |
| RPGFan | 82% |

The game received "mixed" reviews according to the review aggregation website Metacritic. In Japan, Famitsu gave it a score of 29 out of 40.

While noting that they would want to see a new strategy game in the series, IGN felt that the genre shift still worked for it due to their enjoyment of the story and characters. They also called it fun and comical, but questioned how in depth the gameplay would be. GamesRadar+ praised the voice acting and dialogue, but felt that the setting could have been better and that the storyline was repetitive.
