= Tenpei Sato =

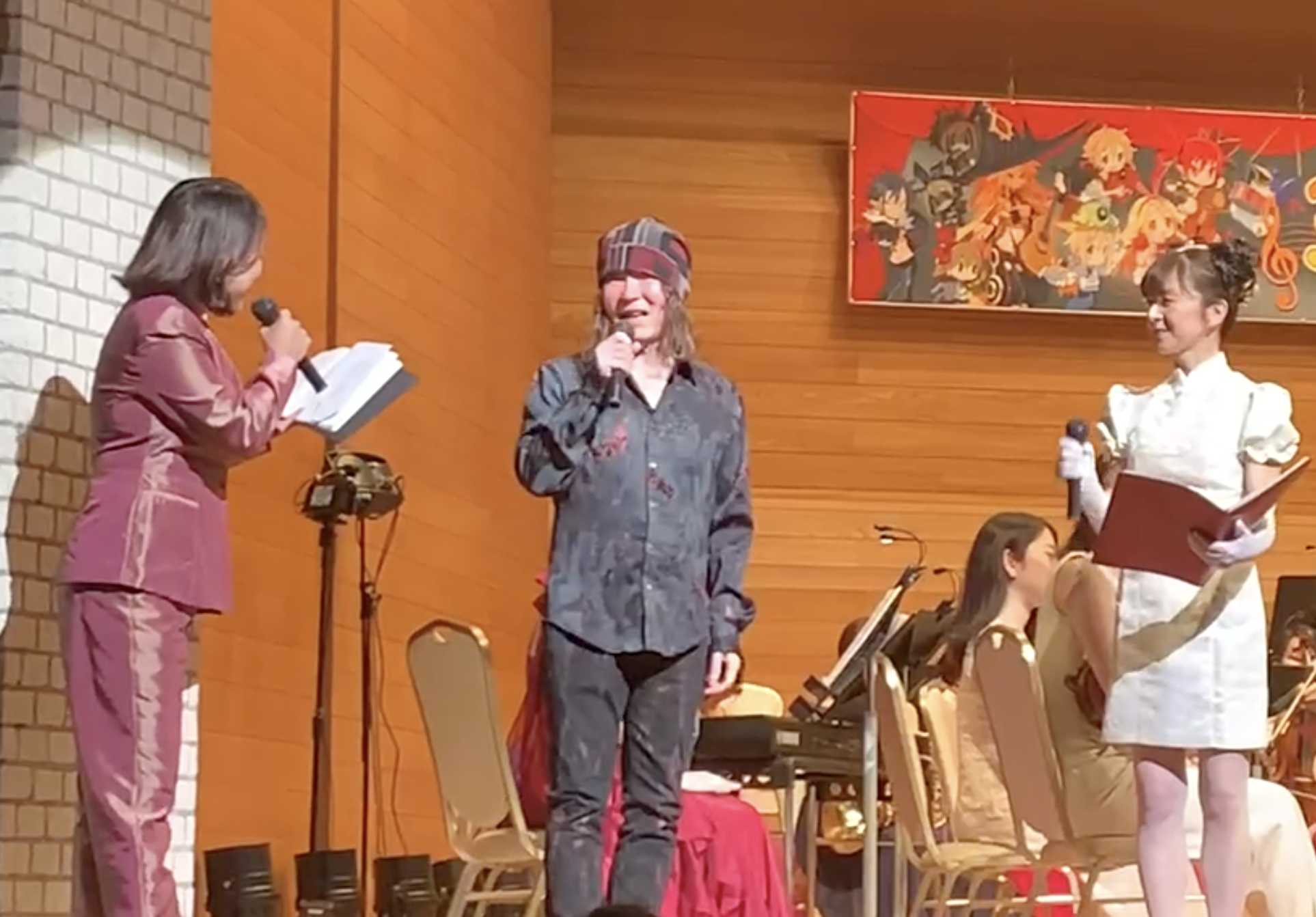
- Tenpei Sato in June 2024

Background information
- Also known as: STRAWBERRY BOY
- Born: April 21, 1967 (age 58); Kawagoe, Saitama, Japan
- Genres: Soundtrack, Video game music, Electronic music, Jazz, Rock
- Occupation(s): Composer, voice actor
- Instrument(s): Piano, electric guitar, vocals
- Years active: 1988–present

Tenpei Sato (佐藤 天平, Satō Tenpei) is a video game composer and voice actor. His most notable works are his soundtracks for Nippon Ichi Software games, such as Disgaea and Phantom Brave. He also provides voice-over for games and movies.

== Biography ==
Sato was born in 1967 in Kawagoe, Japan and grew up in Tokyo. He began playing piano at the age of six, and made his first composition, a piece for guitar, at the age of twelve. His first job was at Telenet Japan, where he composed the score for the action role-playing game XZR and popular side-scroller Valis II. After leaving Telenet, he joined Glodia, and together with Nobuhito Koise, composed the soundtrack to the cult classic Emerald Dragon. Later he would compose both Vain Dream with Abreath Nakamura and Bible Master II. After leaving Glodia, he joined Birdy Soft, and produced soundtracks for four of their games. He has since spent much of his career working with Nippon Ichi Software, which is where his music has gained its greatest recognition. Games he has composed for include the Rhapsody series, Disgaea: Hour of Darkness, La Pucelle: Tactics, and Phantom Brave.

A Nippon Ichi concert by the G-Dream 21 Ladies Orchestra was held on June 23 2024 in Ginza, Tokyo. Sato composed the orchestral arrangements of his work and attended as a special guest. In an interview, he commented that he was most looking forward to the orchestral arrangements of "Determination of a Little Princess" from the 1999 Rhapsody II, a fan favorite track, and "Kill Real" from the 2015 Disgaea 5, which required major revisions to make a chaotic vocal song work for an orchestra.

== Musical style and influence ==
Sato cites Queen, Claude Debussy, Ryuichi Sakamoto, and Kate Bush as major musical influences.

== Works ==
- XZR: Hakai no Gūzō (1988) - with Shinobu Ogawa and Yujiroh
- XZR II: Kanketsuhen (Exile) (1988) - with Shinobu Ogawa
- Cyber City (1989) - with Shinobu Ogawa
- Valis II (1989) - with Shinobu Ogawa, Masahiro Kajiwara, and Jizou Kurabo
- Emerald Dragon (1989) - with Nobuhito Koise
- Vain Dream (1991) - with Nobuhito Koise and Ikki Nakamura
- Alshark (1991)
- Cal (1991)
- Beast (1991)
- Cal II (1991)
- Task Force Harrier EX (1991)
- Joker 2 (1992)
- Beast 2 (1992)
- Imperium (1992) - with Tatsuya Sato and Hiroki Uematsu
- Beast 3 (1993)
- Red: The Adventurous Sequence (1993)
- Alvaleak Continent (1993) - with Nobuhito Koise
- Alien vs. Predator (1993) - with Hisayoshi Ogura
- Shinseiki Odysselya (1993) - with Hisayoshi Ogura
- Bible Master II: The Chaos of Aglia (1994)
- Etemiburu: Tenjoumukyuu (1994)
- Magna Braban: Henreki no Yusha (1994) - with Tatsuya Sato
- Alshark (Sega CD) (1994)
- Super Street Basketball 2 (1994)
- Philip & Marlowe in Bloomland (1994)
- Eko Eko Azaraku: Wizard of Darkness (1995)
- Hard Blow (1997)
- Cocktail Harmony (1998)
- Rhapsody: A Musical Adventure (1998)
- Combat Choro Q (1999)
- Rhapsody II: Ballad of the Little Princess (1999)
- Magnetic Power Microman: Generation 2000 (1999)
- Brigandine: Grand Edition (2000)
- Real Pool (2000)
- Play It Pinball (2000)
- Rhapsody III: Memories of Marl Kingdom (2000)
- Gadget Racers (2000)
- Marl de Jigsaw (2001)
- La Pucelle: Tactics (2002)
- Marl Jong!! (2003)
- Disgaea: Hour of Darkness (2003)
- The Conveni 3 (2003)
- Baskelian (2003)
- Phantom Brave (2004)
- Gunslinger Girl Vol. 1 (2004)
- Gunslinger Girl Vol. 2 (2004)
- Gunslinger Girl Vol. 3 (2004)
- Disgaea 2: Cursed Memories (2006)
- Numpla & Oekaki Puzzle (2006)
- Soul Nomad & the World Eaters (2007)
- Prinny: Can I Really Be the Hero? (2008)
- Disgaea 3: Absence of Justice (2008)
- Disgaea Infinite (2009)
- Prinny 2: Dawn of Operation Panties, Dood! (2010)
- Disgaea 4: A Promise Unforgotten (2011)
- Mugen Souls (2012)
- Disgaea D2: A Brighter Darkness (2013)
- Mugen Souls Z (2013)
- The Witch and The Hundred Knight (2013)
- Disgaea 5: Alliance of Vengeance (2015)
- Trillion: God of Destruction (2015)
- MeiQ: Labyrinth of Death (2015)
- Labyrinth of Refrain: Coven of Dusk (2016)
- Brigandine: The Legend of Runersia (2020)
- Disgaea 6: Defiance of Destiny (2021)
- Kyouran Makaism (2026)
