= Disgaea D2: A Brighter Darkness =

2013 video game

- Developer: Nippon Ichi Software
- Publishers: JP: Nippon Ichi Software; WW: NIS America
- Director: Takehisa Matsuda
- Producer: Shogo Kazakai
- Designer: Takehisa Matsuda
- Artist: Takehito Harada
- Writers: Keiichi Inoue; Yamazi Machina
- Composer: Tenpei Sato
- Series: Disgaea
- Platform: PlayStation 3
- Release: JP: March 20, 2013; EU: September 27, 2013; AU: October 3, 2013; NA: October 8, 2013
- Genre: Tactical role-playing
- Mode: Single-player

Disgaea D2: A Brighter Darkness, known in Japan as Disgaea Dimension 2 (ディスガイア D2, Disugaia D2), is a 2013 video game in the Disgaea series developed by Nippon Ichi Software. The game is a direct sequel to 2003's Disgaea: Hour of Darkness for the PlayStation 2, where the respective main characters of that game are once again the focus. It was released on March 20, 2013, for the PlayStation 3 in Japan.

== Gameplay ==
Gameplay in Disgaea D2 remains the same as other core Disgaea games in the series. Monster Mounting is a new feature that replaces Magichange from Disgaea 3 and Disgaea 4. A humanoid character is able to ride on top a monster allowing the humanoid character to attack on top of the monster while the monster takes damage for the humanoid character. Characters can also build relationships with each other and their compatibility is determined by a heart scale of 1 to 5. This is called "Likeability". Likeability also affects the strength of collaboration attacks used when Monster Mounting depending on the relationship is established between a humanoid character and a monster character, as well as the strength and probability or Team Attacks.

Another feature is the Cheat Shop, which allows the player to modify certain attributes such as lowering the gain rate of something like experience, to raise the gain rate of something else, like Hell. Other changes that enemies and players will have substantially increased HP and SP beyond 10 billion or more, up to 99 billion, unlike the other Disgaea games. The cap can also be increased further due to the new Rasetsu which gives all enemies a new stat multiplier. The player can gain a very small percentage of the enemy's stats when he defeats enemies in the Land of Carnage mode.

Stronger Enemies bills have been changed to a Cheat Shop feature and can be changed freely. Throwing is not limited to throwing straight similar to a Gun's range, but the character can now throw freely within his range similar to the range of a Bow. The Item Bag and Warehouse have been merged into one, with different categories for each Item and the player can have up to 999 Items. The Item World has been renamed to the Item Sea, with changes to Mystery Rooms, Item Assemblies and the inclusion of Bonus Stages which replace Reverse Pirating. The Devil Dojo is a new feature that allows players to increase their Aptitudes to 300%, similar to the Class World and Chara World from previous games. It also can increase EXP, HL, Mana, Weapon EXP, and Skill EXP for characters as well. Multiple characters can be assigned to gain each effect of the Devil Dojo, similar to the Club and Evil Symbol system in previous games.

Weapon Mastery has returned from Disgaea: Hour of Darkness and Cursed Memories. A new feature is that players can raise the rank of a Character's Weapon Mastery when creating a character, or determine a mage/skull's Elemental affinity. Skill Boosting has been removed which allows for a more balanced damage formula like in Disgaea 1 and 2. Bills can be passed and Legendary skills can be bought with Hell instead of Mana. The player can change the character that they use to move around the base instead of being limited to Laharl. Land of Carnage is now unlocked after beating the game as a feature in the Cheat Shop rather than being a separate world. The X-Dimension/Dark World does not return in Disgaea D2, however. Other changes include visual improvements to Menus and HUDs, a more detailed movement grid, and a provided description for the effect of each Innocent.

== Plot ==
Laharl has been crowned Overlord of his Netherworld and has taken his father's place on the throne. However, the demons of his Netherworld do not respect him or his authority. A particular group of the late king's former vassals, called the Krichevskoy Group, are trying to usurp him and put someone whom they find to be a more suitable leader on the throne.

Compounding the issue is the sudden appearance of rapidly multiplying Yuie flowers that are changing the atmosphere of the Netherworld. The Krichevskoy Group blames Laharl for the sudden appearance of the flowers, believing it to be an act of aggression from the angels in retaliation for the events that occurred in Disgaea: Hour of Darkness.

After a run-in with the Krichevskoy Group, Laharl wakes up to find that he is a woman (a.k.a. Laharl-Chan) due to unknown circumstances. Besides him, Etna changes colors, thus becoming "2P Etna", while Flonne develops a habit of oversleeping. It is explained by Etna that the Yuie flowers are affecting the demons in the Netherworld. On the other hand, Sicily is not affected because she is an angel.

There is also a strange man named "Xenolith," who is connected to Etna's past.

== Reception ==
Reception

Aggregate score
Aggregator	Score
Metacritic	74/100

Review scores
Publication	Score
Destructoid	8/10
Electronic Gaming Monthly	5.5/10
Famitsu	33/40
Game Informer	7.5/10
GameRevolution	8/10
GameSpot	8/10
Hardcore Gamer	4/5
IGN	9.1/10
PlayStation Official Magazine – UK	5/10
Polygon	6.5/10
Push Square	8/10
RPGamer	4/5
RPGFan	68%
USgamer	3.5/5
Metro	7/10
Slant Magazine	4/5

The game received "mixed or average reviews" according to the review aggregation website Metacritic. In Japan, Famitsu gave it a score of one nine and three eights for a total of 33 out of 40.
