= Prinny: Can I Really Be the Hero? =

2008 video game

- Developer: Nippon Ichi Software
- Publisher: Nippon Ichi Software
- Director: Tatsuya Izumi
- Designer: Tatsuya Izumi
- Composer: Tenpei Sato
- Series: Disgaea
- Platforms: PlayStation Portable, Nintendo Switch
- Release: PlayStation Portable: JP: November 20, 2008; NA: February 17, 2009; EU: June 26, 2009; AU: July 16, 2009; Nintendo Switch: NA: October 13, 2020; EU: October 16, 2020; AU: October 23, 2020; JP: November 12, 2020
- Genres: Platform, Hack and slash
- Mode: Single-player

Prinny: Can I Really Be the Hero? (プリニー ～オレが主人公でイイんスか?～, Purinī: Ore ga Shujinkō de Iinsuka?) is a 2D side-scrolling comedy platform video game for the PlayStation Portable, developed by Nippon Ichi Software. It is a spin-off title in the Disgaea series.

A re-release titled Prinny 1•2: Exploded and Reloaded was released on the Nintendo Switch in October 2020.

== Gameplay ==
Prinny makes use of the PSP's wireless functionality to record, play, and download maps and other bonuses.

One of its unique features is that, owing to the game's high difficulty, the player gets 1000 lives.

As the in-game hours to complete the mission tick down, the time of day changes, and so do several of the stages alongside the enemies present in the game. In many cases, this can even change the stage's boss, and may also affect the reward the player gets for defeating the boss.

At the end of a stage, the total time to complete the stage (compared to the record time), the total prinnies dead for that stage (both in the stage and against the boss) and the collection of the lucky dolls is tallied up. This gives the Prinny a rank falling between D to S. Some achievements are earned by either having a fast time or high rank.

The Prinny has various moves utilized in platforming and combat. The Hip Pound is the primary method of stunning, where the Prinny drops on an enemy. Hero Prinny can also double jump to reach higher platforms. The majority of attacking in the game is using the Prinny's swords for slash attacks. By performing a basic attack in midair, the Prinny can also perform a long range aerial attack. Holding the circle button allows the Prinny to spin to avoid most attacks when he glows blue. Pressing left or right during a spin allows him to dash off, making him move faster. Should the player press down during the dash, the Prinny will slide, which also allows him to temporarily become invincible. However, spinning for three seconds or more will cause the Prinny to become dizzy and leave him vulnerable. A Prinny Raid attack becomes available after losing all 1000 lives and starting a new game. The player can sacrifice lives to perform a screen-covering attack of exploding Prinnies. If necessary, suicide can also be activated.

A Combo Gauge is situated at the very bottom of the screen. This is usually filled up when the player attacks enemies constantly, or Hip Pounds a checkpoint, which automatically fills the Gauge. A reward is usually displayed on the right side of the Combo Gauge. Filling up the gauge will make the Prinny receive the item, usually a food item for points, or an extra hit point, after which the gauge resets with a new reward.

Various items are also left lying around, and can be used in a variety of ways. Bombs can be found on occasion, and only detonate when thrown, making it useful for long range. Vehicles can also be piloted for a period of time when Hero Prinny Hip Pounds into the cockpit. The majority of vehicles have cannons or the ability to fly, and sometimes, are required to reach a certain point in the stage. When the timer on the vehicle expires, it will automatically self-destruct.

As the game revolves around collecting ingredients for Etna's dessert, many enemies and characters are food based, either in design or name. These include the Gourmet King, the Mage Knight twins "Kim" and "Chi", or the apple and corn monsters.

The game also has many traits taken from another Nippon Ichi game, Makai Kingdom, using a large variety of its monster classes (most food monsters, Apples, Corn, Carrots, along with Spectres, Brush monsters, and Lucky Statues; Gourmet Monsters appear as one boss as well), and many of its vehicles, including a large, slow, yet powerful tank called Gear Metal YAY, a parody of Metal Gear Solid, a machine gun firing pogo turret, and a self-automated levitation machine. Asagi, who made her Debut in Makai Kingdom, plays a large role in the game's Alternate mode, though she has appeared in every Nippon Ichi game past this debut.

== Plot ==
As a Prinny, the player is tasked with tracking down the ingredients for the Ultra Dessert for Etna. She gives the 1000 member squad ten hours to track it down, threatening to kill them all off should they fail. As such, you do not play as any unique prinny in particular. Etna only issues one Scarf, which prevents a prinny from exploding once worn, and as such, once the Hero Prinny is killed, another of the 1000 is simply tossed up to the plate, wearing the same scarf.

Prinnies have to make their way through six different stages of Netherworld during different day time and acquire six random ingredients. Different boss characters await Prinnies to challenge them depending on the time they visit a location. Rewards also change depending on time.

After the six ingredients are collected, the Prinnies head to see Spice-T, a sage who has mastered the art of cooking. In order to retrieve the Ultra Dessert, though, Chefbot-9000 must be defeated.

Afterwards, Sir Sweet, a gourmet demon who prefers sweets, steals the Ultra Dessert and runs off to his Sweet Palace, located beyond the Black Dessert Desert, forcing Prinnies to follow him. After defeating Darth Moab (a parody of Darth Vader) and reaching the heart of Sweet Palace, it is revealed that Sir Sweet has kidnapped many Prinnies in order to combine them with the Ultra Dessert and create his masterpiece dessert, G-Sweet. Prinnies battle the demon in one hard final confrontation.

=== Additional adventures ===
An alternate story (Asagi mode) is unlocked by either finding the ten torn letters, or entering a code at the title screen. The story features Asagi, another Nippon Ichi mascot and secret character. Throughout the seven stages of the alternate story, Asagi battles Prinnies for the right to be the main character of the game, but is defeated.

If enough Lucky Dolls are found, the player can enter Martial Tower, an extremely hard level where two optional boss fights involving characters from the original Disgaea series are located. These encounters also explains some of the game's backstory.

If the player manages to get 100 Lucky Dolls, they are awarded with the optional battle against demon lord Etna herself. The battle includes many cameos from original series characters.

== Downloadable content ==
There are three downloadable stages for Prinny. To play these stages the player must first get the dimensional guide and then talk to her.

- Flonne's Castle: Adds a new stage and Flonne as a boss. Released on February 25, 2009.
- Marona of Phantom Isle: Adds a new stage and Marona as a boss. Released on March 18, 2009.
- Li'l Asagi Comes Home (Martial Tower 2): Adds a new stage and a new form of Asagi as a boss. Released on April 29, 2009.

== Reception ==
Reception

Aggregate score
Aggregator	Score
Metacritic	72/100

Review scores
Publication	Score
Destructoid	3.5/10
Edge	4/10
Eurogamer	6/10
Famitsu	28/40
Game Informer	8/10
GamePro	3/5
GameRevolution	B+
GameSpot	8/10
GameZone	8.2/10
IGN	8.3/10
PlayStation: The Official Magazine	2/5

The game received "average" reviews according to the review aggregation website Metacritic. It drew praise about its sense of humor, boss fights, and visual design, but criticisms about its imprecise controls and difficulty. In Japan, Famitsu gave it a score of all four sevens for a total of 28 out of 40.

== Sequel ==
Nippon Ichi Software released a sequel, Prinny 2: Dawn of Operation Panties, Dood! in 2010. The game picks up where the original ended, this time, with the Prinny Squad being sent to retrieve Etna's panties.
