= Disgaea 5 =

2015 video game

- Developer: Nippon Ichi Software
- Publishers: JP: Nippon Ichi Software; WW: NIS America
- Director: Takehisa Matsuda
- Producer: Sohei Niikawa
- Designers: Takehisa Matsuda; Ryo Sotokawa; Makoto Ito
- Artist: Takehito Harada
- Writers: Sohei Niikawa; Keiichi Inoue; Tatsuya Izumi
- Composer: Tenpei Sato
- Series: Disgaea
- Platforms: PlayStation 4; Nintendo Switch; Windows
- Release: March 25, 2015: PlayStation 4; JP: March 25, 2015; NA: October 6, 2015; EU: October 16, 2015; Nintendo Switch; JP: March 3, 2017; NA: May 23, 2017; PAL: May 26, 2017; Windows; WW: October 22, 2018
- Genre: Tactical role-playing
- Mode: Single-player

Disgaea 5: Alliance of Vengeance (Note: Japanese: 魔界戦記ディスガイア5, Hepburn: Makai Senki Disugaia 5) is a 2015 tactical role-playing video game developed and published by Nippon Ichi Software, and part of the Disgaea series. It was initially released for PlayStation 4 in Japan in March 2015, and by NIS America in North America and Europe in October 2015. A port for the Nintendo Switch was released in Japan in March 2017, as a launch title for the system, and worldwide in May 2017, under the title Disgaea 5 Complete, containing all DLC content from the original, but no new content. This version of the game was released on Microsoft Windows through Steam in October 2018, albeit without network compatibility.

The central story of the game is centered on the idea of "revenge" and takes a darker and more serious direction compared to the previous titles in the series. The demon emperor Void Dark devastates numerous Netherworlds after coming to power, with the help of an army of over one million soldiers known as The Lost. Following this, the Overlords of the Netherworlds under Void Dark's rule attempt to rise up and take revenge.

== Plot ==
=== Characters ===
- Killia (キリア) - The protagonist of the game, and a wandering demon with a vendetta against Void Dark.
- Seraphina (セラフィーヌ) - A sheltered princess and the Overlord of Gorgeous Underworld (絢爛魔界). She truly believes that all men exist to kneel before her. She ran away from her home because her father arranged a marriage of convenience with Void Dark, who she now plans to assassinate.
- Usalia (ウサリア) - The heir of Toto Bunny (兎兎世界), who dislikes fighting. She rides a giant yellow Prinny who fights alongside her during combat. Due to one of Void Dark's subordinates, she was cursed to constantly have to eat curry, the food she once hated, or she will turn into a beast. Now she actually likes curry. She has a very nice personality, which is unusual for a demon.
- Red Magnus (レッドマグナス) The Overlord of Scorching Flame, where vicious demons reside. He is very wild and believes that strength is everything. He is trying to defeat Void Dark to become the strongest Overlord. His Netherworld has been on bad terms with Seraphina's Netherworld for a long time. He says "super" quite often.
- Christo (クリスト) An Overlord who is affiliated with a certain giant Netherworld. He is a gifted tactician, and will do whatever it takes to attain victory. Killia's great magic potential caught his eye, and he views Killia as his best shot for assassinating Void Dark.
- Zeroken (ゼロッケン) A young Overlord and self-proclaimed heir of the legendary Great Demon Fist, Goldion. He appears while Killia and the others are fighting the Lost and helps them, even though no one asked him to. He can be stubborn, but has a flexible mindset, changing his attitude depending on who he's interacting with.

=== Story ===
Disgaea 5 takes place in a universe with many Netherworlds, each of which is ruled by an Overlord who has a unique Overload ability, which can also be used in battle as a special attack. Prior to the story's events, Tyrant Overlord Killidia was a bloodthirsty demon who grew up in and became the Overlord of the ruthless Netherworld Cryo Blood. One day, he fought Goldion, a martial arts master who created the Ultimate Demon Technique fighting style. After Goldion defeated Killidia, he decided to make him his pupil, changing his name to Killia. Killia then fell in love with Goldion's daughter Liezerota, slowly becoming a kinder person as a result. Lieze's brother Void, who has the power to steal Overloads, became jealous of Killia's family bonds, and believed he should be the heir to the Ultimate Demon Technique. However, he did not realize that Goldion selected Killia because Void's impure heart would prevent him from learning the Final Skill.

Unable to master the Final Skill due to the inner conflict with his current and former self, Killia fled Goldion, but Lieze followed him. In an ensuing battle between Killia and Void, Lieze was presumed killed protecting Killia, though she was really just put in stasis with Void's power. Void stole Killia's Overload and changed his name to Void Dark, forming an army - the Lost - to find a means of reviving Lieze.

Killia, now having lost his full powers, joins up with the Overlord Seraphina to fight the Lost. Using Seraphina's base, they ally with several other Overlords to form the Rebel Army and rescue numerous Netherworlds from The Lost. In the process, they encounter Void Dark's second in command, Demon General Bloodis. They later realize that Bloodis is actually Goldion, but brainwashed. Killia and Zeroken attempt to use the Final Skill to purge the evil from Bloodis, and unknowingly succeed, but Goldion keeps this a secret in order to protect them from Void Dark.

Void Dark sends magical spears to many Netherworlds to absorb their energy, and the rebel army destroys them one by one. While doing so, the members of the group come across their respective homeworlds and overcome the obstacles in their hearts to gain or enhance their overloads. Killia overcomes his fear of becoming his past self and accepts it in full, becoming able to use the Final Skill on his own.

The rebel army finally attacks Void Dark's base. There, Goldion sacrifices his life in battle to teach Killia the technique's secret Ultimate Skill, revealing the truth. The group finally encounters Void, who is defeated with said skill, but not before reviving Lieze. She goes berserk due to the uncontrolled amount of dark power inside her, but Killia saves her by combining the Ultimate Skill with the Overloads of his friends. With The Lost defeated, the Netherworlds begin rebuilding and the group disperses. Killia and Lieze live peacefully in the fringes of the Netherworlds, and after the game's credits, the Rebel Army meets again to deal with new threats, with Lieze joining them.

== Gameplay ==
Battle interface screenshot

The game involves the player traveling across different Netherworlds in an attempt to bring the Overlords and heirs of each different world to join forces together to fight against Void Dark. The game features new systems not seen within prior titles in the Disgaea series. In addition, the number of characters displayable on-screen has increased to 100, compared to 10 characters on the earlier PlayStation 3 titles.

New features include the display of resistance and affiliation statistics when units on the battlefield are highlighted, and a revenge system that is triggered when party members are fallen. The game also introduced a new type of special attack known as Maougis. Certain characters are able to pair up in specific duos to unleash special moves known as fusion skills. New playable character classes include dark knights with melee weapons, maids with guns, and fairies with support magic, while the soldier, magician, priest, priestess and archer classes from earlier titles returned.

== Development ==
On September 1, 2014, the game was announced at the Tokyo Game Show. The development team initially considered a multi-platform release including the PlayStation 3, however decided to create a game "which could only be done on the PS4 platform." A trial version of the game was made available via download code included within the September 25, 2014, issue of Dengeki PlayStation. The game is produced by Sohei Niikawa, with the character designs by Takehito Harada and music composed by Tenpei Sato. Before the release the game was promised to take a darker and more serious direction, unlike many of the past games in the series.

Disgaea 5 was published in Japan by Nippon Ichi Software, with NIS America handling the publishing duties in North America and Europe, and the localization of the game into English and French.

The Nintendo Switch port, Disgaea 5 Complete, was officially announced during the Nintendo Switch presentation on January 13, 2017. This version of the game contains all of the previously released downloadable content for the PlayStation 4 version. It was later ported to the Microsoft Windows; this version removed all of the game's online features.

=== Release ===
Disgaea 5 was first released in Japan on March 26, 2015, and later in North America on October 6, and in Europe on October 16. A limited edition was also announced, which included a collector's box, two-disc soundtracks, hard cover art book and several other items. A port for the Nintendo Switch was released in Japan on March 3, 2017, as a launch title for the system. This port was released in North America on May 23, 2017, and Europe and Australia on May 26, 2017.

The PC release of Disgaea 5 Complete by NIS America faced lengthy delays. While initially scheduled to release in April 2018, it was delayed until the summer, and ultimately to October 22, 2018, due to an unspecified "issue", despite the game's demo - accidentally containing the full game - having already been released and quickly pulled from Steam. The unlocked demo was later distributed on piracy sites, allowing the entire title to be played illicitly. The unclear reasons for the delay, as well as the removal of all network features, including the ability to send messages, items and custom maps to other players, again due to unspecified "irreconcilable platform differences", resulted in the release being called a "months-long debacle" by Kotaku.

== Reception ==
Reception

Aggregate score
Aggregator	Score
Metacritic	PS4: 80/100; NS: 81/100

Review scores
Publication	Score
Destructoid	8/10
Famitsu	33/40
Game Informer	8.5/10
GameRevolution	4/5
GameSpot	8/10
GamesTM	8/10
GameTrailers	8.6/10
Hardcore Gamer	4/5
IGN	8.7/10
USgamer	4/5
Digitally Downloaded	5/5

The game sold 22,725 physical retail copies within its first week of release in Japan. The game has received largely positive reviews, with an aggregate score of 80/100 on Metacritic for its original PS4 version.
