= Disgaea 6: Defiance of Destiny =

2021 video game

- Developer: Nippon Ichi Software
- Publisher: Nippon Ichi Software
- Artist: Takehito Harada
- Composer: Tenpei Sato
- Series: Disgaea
- Platforms: Nintendo Switch; PlayStation 4; PlayStation 5; Windows
- Release: January 28, 2021: Switch; JP: January 28, 2021; AU: July 9, 2021; WW: June 29, 2021; PlayStation 4; JP: January 28, 2021; WW: June 28, 2022; PlayStation 5; JP: June 16, 2022; WW: June 28, 2022; Windows; WW: June 28, 2022
- Genre: Tactical role-playing
- Mode: Single-player

Disgaea 6: Defiance of Destiny (Note: Japanese: 魔界戦記ディスガイア6, Hepburn: Makai Senki Disugaia 6) is a tactical role-playing video game developed and published by Nippon Ichi Software as part of the Disgaea series. It was released for Nintendo Switch and PlayStation 4 on January 28, 2021, in Japan, and by Sega on May 27, 2021, in Asia. It was released worldwide for Nintendo Switch on June 29, 2021. In total, the game was translated into French, English, Traditional Chinese and Korean. A version with all previous downloadable content, titled Disgaea 6 Complete, was released for PlayStation 5 on June 16, 2022, in Japan, followed by a worldwide release on June 28, 2022, alongside PlayStation 4 and Windows platforms.

== Gameplay ==
The game involves turn based combat on grid-based battlefields. There's a lot of focus placed on effective management of the in-depth systems that surround that combat, and individual characters can reach high levels, up to 99999999, and be able to perform 10000000000000000 (10 quadrillion) damage in a single attack, which are much higher values compared to previous entries in the series. Some of the new features of the game include auto-battles and the “Demonic Intelligence” system: each character starts with a set of pre-programmed AI routines that the player can choose between, but they can also build additional routines for them from scratch or by copying an existing routine. There are several classes the player can build characters around. There are a number of management aspects in the game, including a senate chamber in the main hub where monsters and demons from various fictional political parties vote on the underlying rules of the gameplay.

For the first time in the series' history, the game uses 3D graphics for both battlefields and characters.

== Plot ==
=== Setting ===
The game follows the story of Zed, a zombie who is on a quest to defeat the God of Destruction terrorizing the Netherworld, a parallel universe inhabited by demons. There are multiple Netherworlds, each ruled by a different overlord. Zed has lost to the God many times already, but every time he dies he is reborn thanks to a power called "Super Reincarnation". Every time he gets reincarnated, he gets slightly stronger than he was before. After each death he is taken to a new world, where he meets a new companion, and attempts to defeat the God of Destruction once more.

=== Story ===
Act 1

The Netherworld has been assault by a being of unimaginable power - A God of Destruction. The Dark Assembly, led by Overlord Ivar, begin to plan on how to defeat the God of Destruction. However, they are interrupted by the arrival of the zombie Zed and his zombie dog-like companion, Cerberus. Zed claims to have already defeated The God of Destruction, a fact that Ivar and the rest of the Assembly find incredulous. Ivar sentences Zed to death for spreading falsehoods, unless Zed can indeed prove that he defeated the God of Destruction. Zed begins to explain the series of events leading to his defeat of the God of Destruction, forming a framing device for the first act of the story.

On an already dying world, Zed rescues several demons from hostile foes. No one believes that he can defeat the God of Destruction, but Zed attempts to fight him anyway. He fails to defeat The God of Destruction, seemingly dying. It is here that it is revealed that Zed has the power of Super Reincarnation - the ability to reincarnate again and again until he achieves his goal. Cerberus further explains that Super Reincarnation, which he seemingly created, seeks the most optimal path of resistance, taking Zed to worlds where he will gain the power needed to defeat The God of Destruction. Zed and Cerberus both claim that Zed has 'died' tens of thousands of times. Arriving on a human world, Zed meets Misedor, an obscenely rich king who has sent a hero of legend, who can revive, to defeat the God of Destruction. However, the hero, Yarmarda, has failed one hundred times and become a recluse. After defeating Yarmada, Zed once again fails and dies to the God of Destruction; however, this time, Misedor Super Reincarnates alongside Zed.

Zed then arrives in the Musical World, where he meets Melodia, a princess seeking her 'happy ending', who has sent hundreds of 'princes' who've arrived on her world to defeat the God of Destruction. She accompanies Zed, believing him to be her prince, but once again Zed fails to defeat The God of Destruction. As before, Melodia Super Reincarnates alongside Zed. Arriving at world within a television show, Zed and company meet Piyori, a superhero parodying the Super Sentai franchise. Piyori, seeking to raise the ratings of her show, and looking for the truth of justice, recruits Zed and company into her squad, fighting against a generic villainous army. They are once again defeated by the God of Destruction, with Piyori coming along this time. Arriving in an academy, the crew meet Majolene, a 10,000 year old principal who seeks to protect her students from the God of Destruction. Whilst attempting to gain an advantage, Majolene is transformed into a young magical girl, which she finds terrifyingly embarrassing. The team loses once more, though it has become clear they are beginning to hold their own in their battles with the God of Destruction. During this time, we learn of Zed's past with his younger sister, Bieko, who was killed by the God of Destruction, setting Zed onto the path of Super Reincarnation.

The party then loops through the last four worlds once again, with each of the party members personally progressing and gaining more power. Misedor takes charge of his path in life and becomes a Hero King; Melodia confronts an evil doppelganger of herself, named Naïve, and becomes assured of her right to seek a happy ending; Piyori understands the meaning of justice and comes to terms with the loss of her brother; and Majolene accepts her transformations, and declares she will defy fate. Each time, they fail against the God of Destruction, but grow closer and closer to victory. It is at this point that we learn that Bieko was not killed by the God of Destruction - Bieko is the God of Destruction, and is aware of the destruction she has caused, and the tens of thousands of deaths she has dealt to Zed. Zed and his party travel to Zed's homeworld, defeating old bullies and visiting his home, before they finally defeat The God of Destruction, seemingly killing Bieko, and apparently freeing Zed from Super Reincarnation, before accepting his death.

Back in the present, Ivar questions how Zed is still alive after speaking of his own death. Cerberus claims that Ivar is the Overlord who turned Bieko into the God of Destruction, with the Dark Assembly, moved by Zed's tale, votes to execute Ivar. Suddenly, Bieko arrives at the Dark Assembly, claiming Ivar is not the guilty party.

Act 2: The Truth Comes Out

Using his accusation of Ivar as a ruse, Zed and Bieko reveal the true culprit behind the latter's change to a God of Destruction: Cerberus. Cerberus is revealed to be an ancient 'Super Sage' named Misual, who developed Super Reincarnation in an attempt to change fate, and prevent the death of his love interest Releiza, the Legendary Witch. When Zed attempted to kill the God of Destruction, Releiza spoke to him in a vision, instructing him on how to defeat The God Of Destruction without killing Bieko. Misual developed the ability to create Gods of Destruction under the sponsorship of Ivar, who claims he was told it was simply science, and he'd have the chance to fight something incredibly strong; Cerberus instead sought, in a sense of nihilistic despair, to create a being capable of destroying the universe. Ivar subsequently apologizes for his role in the disaster, and joins the party. As they fight towards Cerberus through Ivar's palace, Zed's body beings to crumble under the sheer weight of his power and his repeated Super Reincarnations. During the struggle, Cerberus kidnaps Bieko, escaping to another world. In pursuit, Zed and company arrive at a brand new world, being delayed from catching up to Cerberus by a variety of foes they've fought before, led by Naïve. Each of the party reconciles with their former foes, and Zed follows Cerberus back to his and Bieko's home Netherworld.

Cerberus locates and returns his brain to his original body, Misual, and once again turns Bieko into a God of Destruction, and the party seemingly crumbles under her sheer power. However, Bieko resists the control Misual has placed over her, breaking free of her form and declaring she'll fight alongside Zed and his friends. Misual flees once more, and Zed follows once more, despite his party members warning him his body cannot take much more strain. They arrive in a verdant, peaceful Netherworld, occupied by a still-living Releiza. They have found themselves in the past, at the time when Releiza was forced to defend herself from hordes of demons. Beneath the netherworld, they found the DNA of an incredibly powerful being, known as The Majin, and upon learning defeat was inevitable, Releiza was forced to absorb the DNA and become a God of Destruction. In the wake of her destructive rampage, Misual was forced to kill her. Misual spent tens of thousands of cycles, attempting to save Releiza from her fate, but was unable to prevent her death. Despite that, Zed and his friends manage to break through, and prevent this version of Releiza from dying. Releiza informs Zed that he is the zombie of the ancient Majin that died beneath the Netherworld - the pain he has been suffering is the destructive urges of the Majin within him, and when it overwhelms him, he'll become a true God of Destruction. Majolene surmises that this was likely Misual's plan from the outset - force Zed to unleash the power of the Majin, and destroy the universe. During this time, Beiko urges Zed to forgive Cerberus, speaking of the time they were a family together. Zed begins to soften towards Misual, now knowing the trauma he suffered losing his beloved.

Zed and company Super Reincarnate one last time to force Misual to end his universe-ending crusade, now armed with the knowledge that fate can be averted. Pushing Zed to his limit, Misual forces Zed to begin the transformation into the Majin of legend, but the energy of his friends and family, funneled through a kiss from Melodia, prevents the transformation. With assistance from Piyori's foe Ruffian Red, Hero Yarmada, Naïve, and Majolene's now saved student, Zed and company break through and finally defeat a now insane and overpowering Misual. Misual, now understanding that one truly can defy fate, accepts his death. In the aftermath of the battle, Misual finds himself still alive - once again in the body of Cerberus, with Zed and Bieko once again welcoming him into their ramshackle family.

Sometime later, Zed's friends confront Ivar, asking where he and Bieko have vanished to. Ivar reveals he'd given them a reward for saving the universe. In a final scene, Zed, Bieko and Cerberus are seen in a verdant and lush Netherworld, enjoying a meal as a family.

== Reception ==
Reception

Aggregate scores
Aggregator	Score
Metacritic	NS: 73/100; PS5: 68/100; PC: 71/100
OpenCritic	57% recommend

Review scores
Publication	Score
Hardcore Gamer	NS: 3/5; PS5: 3/5
Nintendo Life	8/10
Nintendo World Report	8/10
Push Square	7/10
RPGamer	2.5/5
RPGFan	85/100
TouchArcade	3.5/5

Disgaea 6: Defiance of Destiny and Complete received "mixed or average" reviews according to review aggregator Metacritic. Nintendo Life gave a positive review, arguing that the game is "easily the most streamlined and enjoyable entry in the series yet," giving the game a score of 8/10. However several reviews noted serious performance issues of the Nintendo Switch version. CGMagazine described it as the "weakest entry in the series", in part due to this.

The game sold 23,551 physical retail copies on Switch and 15,761 physical retail copies on PlayStation 4 for a total of 39,312 copies sold within its first week of release in Japan.

== Re-release ==
Disgaea 6: Defiance of Destiny was re-released for Microsoft Windows, PlayStation 4 and PlayStation 5 in June 2022 as Disgaea 6 Complete.
