= Prinny 2 =

2010 video game

- U.S. cover art
- Developer: Nippon Ichi Software
- Publisher: Nippon Ichi Software
- Series: Disgaea
- Platforms: PlayStation Portable, Nintendo Switch
- Release: PlayStation Portable: JP: March 25, 2010; EU: December 15, 2010 (Digital only); NA: January 10, 2011 (PlayStation Store); NA: January 11, 2011; Nintendo Switch: NA: October 13, 2020; EU: October 16, 2020; AU: October 23, 2020; JP: November 12, 2020
- Genre: Platform
- Mode: Single-player

Prinny 2: Dawn of Operation Panties, Dood! (プリニー2 〜特攻遊戯! 暁のパンツ大作戦ッス!!〜, Purinī 2 〜 tokkō yūgi! Akatsuki no pantsu dai sakusenssu!!〜) is a platform game by Nippon Ichi Software released in Japan in 2010. The game made it to the North American market in 2011.

Prinny 2 is the sequel to Prinny: Can I Really Be the Hero? and part of the Disgaea series. Both games were re-released together as Prinny 1•2: Exploded and Reloaded for the Nintendo Switch in October 2020.

== Plot ==
The game opens with the tutorial, in which Prinny first meets up with the Phantom Thief, a legendary thief of the Netherworld who steals rare items, though Prinny doesn't know who he is yet. When the Prinny Squad enters Etna's castle, she informs them that her panties were stolen, and forces the Prinny Squad to look for them by sunrise, or else she'll turn them into panties. A note left by the Phantom Thief tells the Prinnies that he stole the panties, so the Squad goes looking for a rare item to lure him with.

=== Asagi Wars: The Vengeance of Asagi ===
In this bonus story, Prinny, Asagi, and Flonne are watching TV, when a promo for a new tournament called Asagi Wars appears. Various Asagi doppelgängers are entered in the tournament, but Prinny Asagi, despite being the real Asagi, was not invited to the tournament. When she hears that "outside interference is encouraged", Asagi goes out to get vengeance on her doppelgängers.

== Gameplay ==
The player must navigate through dangerous levels defeat the boss at the end of each stage. The player has 1000 lives to compensate for the game's difficulty. Introduced to this game are three new moves, which can be accessed by entering Break Mode when the Combo Gauge is filled by collecting sweets. Break Mode increases attack power until the Combo Gauge is empty. The Husky Hip Pound is an advanced version of the Hip Pound that also deals damage. The Prinny Cyclone is an advanced version of the spinning dodge move. By enlarging the red scarf, the spinning dodge also deals damage. Finally, the Prinnikaze is a spinning air tackle that rockets into the ground.

The game comes with the ability to choose from three difficulties. Normal mode retains the original gameplay of the first game. The Prinny can take three hits before he dies. In Baby Mode, the scarf icons are replaced with diapers, and areas that would normally deal damage are covered by destructible blocks. In Hell Mode, the Prinny gets no scarves, and as such, instantly dies in one hit, which can prove difficult later on in the game.

=== Prinny Asagi Gameplay ===
In the special story mode, Asagi Wars: The Vengeance of Asagi, the player takes control of Prinny Asagi. Unlike the original gameplay, Prinny Asagi doesn't have a hit count to determine health; instead, her health is determined by the Ratings Gauge, a large meter that appears at the top of the screen. By performing flashy moves and following the audience, the Ratings Gauge will fill up. When Asagi takes damage, the Ratings Gauge will drop. If the Ratings Gauge reaches 0.00%, Prinny Asagi automatically explodes.

Unlike Prinnies, Prinny Asagi has access to a large arsenal of weapons, which can be cycled through with the L shoulder and R shoulder buttons. However, like all Prinnies, she can use the Hip Pound and the spinning dodge. Her weapons consist of the Asagi Wonder Buster, the Asagi Gatling Gun, Asagi's Awesome Drill, Asagi's Happy Flamethrower, Asagi's Ridiculous Bazooka, the Asagi Shotgun, the Asagi Cat, an eggplant, and an electric guitar. Though some weapons aren't practical for combat, using specific weapons can make the Ratings Gauge increase. For example, the electric guitar causes the Combo Gauge to fill, which induces Break Mode, which fills the Ratings Gauge. Asagi is also limited by ammo for each weapon she owns, with some exceptions, such as the eggplant and the electric guitar.

During the normal story, when Asagi is playable, her gameplay remains the same, spare two exceptions. Whenever a stage is started, Asagi will crush and destroy one Prinny, resulting in the loss of one life. Instead of having the Ratings Gauge, her health is governed by scarves, like all other Prinnies.

== Reception ==
Reception

Aggregate score
Aggregator	Score
Metacritic	68/100

Review scores
Publication	Score
1Up.com	C
Destructoid	7/10
Famitsu	28/40
GamePro	3/5
GameRevolution	B−
GameSpot	6/10
GameTrailers	6.3/10
GameZone	7/10
Hardcore Gamer	3.75/5
IGN	7/10
Pocket Gamer	4/5
PlayStation: The Official Magazine	6/10

The game received "average" reviews according to the review aggregation website Metacritic. In Japan, Famitsu gave it a score of one eight, one seven, one six, and one seven for a total of 28 out of 40. Frequently cited in reviews are the game's high level of difficulty, limited and stiff controls and camera systems, and an abundance of unlockable content.
