= Disgaea 3 =

2008 video game

- Developer: Nippon Ichi Software
- Publishers: JP: Nippon Ichi Software; NA: NIS America; EU: Square Enix; WW: NIS America (Vita)
- Director: Masahiro Yamamoto
- Producer: Sohei Niikawa
- Designers: Masahiro Yamamoto; Yoshinori Yamamoto
- Writers: Kaori Shinmei; Sohei Niikawa
- Composer: Tenpei Sato
- Series: Disgaea
- Platforms: PlayStation 3 PlayStation Vita
- Release: January 31, 2008: PlayStation 3; JP: January 31, 2008; NA: August 26, 2008; EU: February 20, 2009; AU: March 5, 2009; PlayStation Vita; JP: December 17, 2011; NA: April 17, 2012; EU: April 20, 2012; AU: April 26, 2012
- Genre: Tactical role-playing
- Mode: Single-player

Disgaea 3: Absence of Justice (Note: Japanese: 魔界戦記ディスガイア3, Hepburn: Makai Senki Disugaia Surī) is a tactical role-playing game developed and published by Nippon Ichi Software for the PlayStation 3. It is the third game in the Disgaea series and the first to be released for the PlayStation 3. It received a sequel, Disgaea 4: A Promise Unforgotten, in 2011.

Disgaea 3 was re-released for the PlayStation Vita in December 2011 in Japan and 2012 in other regions with all downloadable content from the PS3 version available at launch.

== Gameplay ==
Disgaea 3 is a tactical RPG; most of the game involves battles on isometric maps upon which the player controls a group of characters. Maps often feature "geo blocks" with statistical effects on the battlefield, that, unlike in previous games, can be stacked or stood upon. Many objects in the environment, including these blocks, and characters themselves, can be lifted, thrown, or destroyed. Certain classes can create boxes or barrels to create stepping stones. Characters can form stacks, allowing them to reach higher areas or perform "tower attacks". When throwing a character to a monster-type ally, they will bounce an extra distance based on the monster's direction and throwing stat.

With the newly introduced "magichange" feature, monsters are able to transform into specific weapons in which a partner can use to execute a strong technical attack. To do this they must be assigned to the same club as the ally, and the change is temporary. After two turns the monster disappears from battle, unless in the magintology club which increases it to 3 turns.

Characters now have certain weapons that they are proficient with, much like Makai Kingdom's battle system. While characters can use other weapons, they won't be able to use the weapon's skills. Weapon skills are now unlocked by purchasing them with mana collected from defeating enemies. Many of the skills' effective areas have been rearranged, and each weapon now has two hidden skills.

One can incorporate a maximum of two special augmentation abilities, known as "evilities", to improve a character's performance in battle. One skill is standard for each class, the second skill can be customized. When a monster executes the Magic Change skill, their main evility is also transferred to their partner.

Bonus maps and characters can be accessed after the final boss is defeated, at which point an epilogue chapter opens. The player may choose to continue to the extra maps, or to replay the entire game with stronger characters as in previous titles. From within the epilogue, many extreme challenges await hardcore players under various circumstances, from maxing out characters to the millions, to defeating the final secret boss and then the land of carnage.

== Story ==
=== Setting ===
The game takes place in a Netherworld school called the Evil Academy. In this demon school, a good student is one who engages in evil activities such as truancy, never showing up to class, and getting in fights with others. The student who participates the most in these kind of activities is known as the Honor Student, while demons who are admirable by human standards are known as delinquents.

=== Plot ===
Mao, son of the netherworld's Overlord, has not once attended class since the beginning of school. His ambition is to overthrow his father and claim his title (along with claiming revenge for having his gaming systems destroyed). After reading a few volumes in his manga about the Super Hero, Mao resolves to become a hero, convinced that it is the quickest way to gain enough power.

Eventually, Raspberyl, Mao's childhood rival, learns about his goal, and realizes that if Mao became a Hero, it would endanger her position as the academy's top delinquent. She makes up her mind to stop Mao's plan to sustain her title. However, since Raspberyl is a demon delinquent, she tries to solve the problem without violence and talk him out of it instead. Almaz, a meek hero fanboy from Earth on a mission to protect princess Sapphire by defeating the overlord who he believes is targeting her, misunderstands the situation and tries to save the day. Mao accepts the challenge and defeats him, stealing Almaz's title and giving him the title of "Demon". Almaz slowly starts becoming a demon, but he sticks with Mao, who claims he is his slave now, to defeat the overlord.

Visiting the "Heart Bank", in which demons store parts of their heart and memories to be less feeling, they make several attempts to open up Mao's heart, where the hero title is stored, but are unsuccessful. Geoffrey, Mao's butler, is unhappy with Almaz's meddling. At one point, Mao comes across his sealed memory of him contributing to his father's demise by telling the Super Hero Aurum his weak spot. Aurum later clarifies this by revealing that the Overlord intentionally lost in order to protect Mao from his ultimate attack.

Eventually, all the freshmen become delinquents, being brainwashed by the Senior class. After fighting them, Mao learns that Geoffrey orchestrated the plan. Actually the Super Hero Aurum in disguise, Geoffrey attempted to raise Mao to be the ultimate overlord so he could eventually destroy him. Mao tries to get revenge by destroying the human world, but the words of his friends convince him not to release the evil in his heart, and he instead goes after Aurum, who is disappointed to see Mao has not succumbed to evil. Aurum initially dismisses Mao as weak, but Mao uses the power of a hero to defeat Aurum. The ghost of his father gives Mao the Overlord title and he runs the Evil Academy henceforth.

== Development ==
=== PlayStation Home ===
Nippon Ichi Software has released two Game Spaces for the game in the Asian and Japanese versions of the PlayStation 3's online community-based service, PlayStation Home. The first space is called "The Nether Institute, Evil Academy" and features six Prinnies. The users can purchase a displayable Prinny, answer a questionnaire, purchase Disgaea 3 content, and take "Disgaea tests." The second space is called "The Chairman's Room" and features the "Netherworld Millionaire" card game and an "Arcade Game". They were released on April 23, 2009, in the Japanese version of Home and on July 2, 2009, in the Asian version of Home. The game supports Home rewards currently for the Japanese version of the game where users are able to win decorative ornaments for their personal spaces in Home by earning trophies in the game. It has been confirmed that there is an unlockable ornament in the North American version of the game as well. The two game spaces were released to the North American version on June 10, 2010.

=== Additional content ===
Additional unlockable content became available in Japan once the game was released and on December 22, 2008, in North America, and was released monthly in Japan until January 2009 and once or twice a month in North America until August 2009. The content includes new characters able to be accessed once the main story is complete, character and monster classes, the modes "Item World Command Attack" and "Class World Command Attack", and a side story following Raspberyl after the end of the game. Access to this additional content must be paid for.

Available characters include Captain Gordon, Jennifer, Thursday, Kurtis in his human and prinny forms, and Mid-Boss from Disgaea: Hour of Darkness, Adell, Rozalin, Taro, Hanako, Yukimaru, and Tink from Disgaea 2: Cursed Memories, Zetta and Pram from Makai Kingdom: Chronicles of the Sacred Tome, Gig and Revya from Soul Nomad & the World Eaters, Priere from La Pucelle: Tactics, Marjoly from Rhapsody: A Musical Adventure, Hero Prinny from Prinny: Can I Really Be the Hero?, and Kogure Souichirou from Hayarigami. Aramis from Disgaea and Pleinair, Takehito Harada's mascot character, can be unlocked by completing the additional modes.

=== Re-release ===
An enhanced remaster of Disgaea 3: Absence of Justice named Disgaea 3 Return (魔界戦記ディスガイア3 Return, Makai Senki Disugaia 3 Ritān) was released for the PlayStation Vita as a launch title in Japan on December 17, 2011. It was released in North America and Europe in April 2012, subtitled Absence of Detention.

== Reception ==
Reception

Aggregate score
Aggregator	Score	
Aggregator	PS Vita	PS3
Metacritic	78/100	78/100

Review scores
Publication	Score	
Publication	PS Vita	PS3
Destructoid	N/A	7.5/10
Eurogamer	N/A	8/10
Famitsu	32/40	32/40
Game Informer	N/A	8.25/10
GamePro	N/A	4/5
GameRevolution	N/A	B−
GameSpot	7/10	7.5/10
GameSpy	N/A	3.5/5
IGN	8.5/10	6.7/10
Pocket Gamer	4/5	N/A
PlayStation: The Official Magazine	8/10	4/5
Push Square	8/10	N/A
RPGamer	3.5/5	3.5/5
RPGFan	84%	(US) 87% (JP) 85%
Metro	7/10	N/A
Teletext GameCentral	N/A	8/10

The game received "generally favorable reviews" on both platforms according to the review aggregation website Metacritic. In Japan, Famitsu gave both Absence of Justice and Absence of Detention each a score of 32 out of 40.

Andrew Fitch of 1Up.com said of Absence of Justice, "This is possibly the most accessible incarnation to date, and if you've overlooked Disgaea until now, give this one a shot." Eurogamer noted the difficult learning curve for new players but commended the same game for its overall depth. IGN's Ryan Clements was more critical of Absence of Justice, citing its dated graphics (on PS3) and camera control but praised the music quality and length summing up his review with "Ultimately, I think Absence of Justice is just the repackaging of a formula that's passed [sic] its prime." Edge gave it a score of eight out of ten, saying, "That Disgaea 3 is perhaps the finest of its self-referential and casually wicked yarns, [sic] is almost an irrelevance. We've got numbers to think about." Louis Bedigian of GameZone gave it a score of 7.7 out of 10, saying that it was "Best suited for the Disgaea fan who loves the series solely (or at least primarily) for its gameplay, and for newcomers who will skip the story regardless of its quality."

Reviewing the Vita version, Absence of Detention, on PlayStation LifeStyle, Heath Hindman cited camera control and Vita's touch features as problematic, but was more positive about Disgaea's formula than Clements. His review had particularly great things to say about the story and characters, and made it clear that the graphics look better on Vita's small screen than they did on a TV. Vito Gesualdi of GameZone gave it 8.5 out of 10, saying, "As the first true RPG on the PlayStation Vita, Disgaea 3 definitely has a lot of expectations to answer to. Thankfully, this largely flawless experience delivers."

David Jenkins of Teletext GameCentral gave Absence of Justice a score of eight out of ten, saying, "You'd never believe this was actually a PS3 game, but apart from the graphics this is the best Disgaea yet." Later, when GameCentral was switched over to Metro, Roger Hargreaves gave Absence of Detention a score of seven out of ten, saying, "It's not the best the series has to offer, and it's clearly just a PlayStation 3 port, but Disgaea was made for portables and has never worked better than on the PS Vita." Armando Rodriguez, however, gave the same PS Vita version a score of 8.8 out of 10, saying, "The fun story and the deep and complicated combat mechanics are worth seeing. Sure, sometimes it can get TOO COMPLICATED but the nice thing is, if you get overwhelmed, using common sense and the basics is enough to overcome most challenges."
