= Disgaea 7: Vows of the Virtueless =

2023 role-playing video game

- Developer: Nippon Ichi Software
- Publishers: JP: Nippon Ichi Software; WW: NIS America
- Series: Disgaea
- Platforms: Nintendo Switch; PlayStation 4; PlayStation 5; Windows; Nintendo Switch 2
- Release: January 26, 2023: PlayStation 4, PlayStation 5, Nintendo Switch; JP: January 26, 2023; NA: October 3, 2023; EU: October 6, 2023; AU: October 13, 2023; Windows; NA: October 3, 2023; EU: October 6, 2023; AU: October 13, 2023; Nintendo Switch 2; WW: October 10, 2025
- Genre: Tactical role-playing
- Modes: Single-player, multiplayer

Disgaea 7: Vows of the Virtueless (Note: Japanese: 魔界戦記ディスガイア7, Hepburn: Makai Senki Disugaia 7) is a tactical role-playing video game developed and published by Nippon Ichi Software, and part of the Disgaea series. It was released on January 26, 2023, in Japan for the PlayStation 4, PlayStation 5 and Nintendo Switch and was released in North America on October 3, 2023, also for Microsoft Windows. A version with all previous downloadable content, titled Disgaea 7 Complete, was released for PlayStation 4, PlayStation 5 and Nintendo Switch in Japan on July 25, 2024, with a Western release for the Nintendo Switch 2 on October 10, 2025.

== Gameplay ==
Like its predecessor, Disgaea 7 is a tactical role-playing video game. The game follows Fuji, a demon warrior, and his companion Pirilika as they embark on an adventure in a netherworld named Hinomoto. New mechanics, such as "Jumbability" which increases the size of the player character, are introduced. The game also features a competitive multiplayer mode, a first for the franchise.

== Development ==
The western release for the game was officially revealed by Nippon Ichi Software in January 2023. A demo for the game was released for PS4, PS5 and Switch owners in September 2023.

== Reception ==
Reception

Aggregate scores
Aggregator	Score
Metacritic	PS5: 84/100; NS: 83/100
OpenCritic	96% recommend

Review score
Publication	Score
Famitsu	32/40

According to review aggregator Metacritic, the game received "generally favorable" reviews upon release. Fellow review aggregator OpenCritic assessed that the game received "mighty" approval, being recommended by 96% of critics. In Japan, four critics from Famitsu gave the game a total score of 32 out of 40, with each critic awarding the game an 8 out of 10. The game sold 13,094 physical retail copies on Switch, 3,568 physical retail copies on PlayStation 4 and 2,324 physical retail copies on PlayStation 5 in addition to 31,014 digital copies within its first week of release in Japan.
