= Phantom Brave =

2004 video game

- Developer: Nippon Ichi Software (Note: Wii version developed by System Prisma)
- Publishers: JP: Nippon Ichi Software; WW: NIS America; EU: Koei (PS2)
- Directors: Yoshitsuna Kobayashi; Shinichi Ikeda; Takeshi Hasegawa
- Producers: Haru Akenaga; Sōhei Niikawa
- Designer: Yoshitsuna Kobayashi
- Programmer: Yoshitsuna Kobayashi
- Artist: Takehito Harada
- Writer: Sōhei Niikawa
- Composer: Tenpei Sato
- Platforms: PlayStation 2; Wii; PlayStation Portable; Microsoft Windows; Nintendo Switch
- Release: PlayStation 2: JP: January 22, 2004; NA: August 31, 2004; EU: February 4, 2005; Wii: JP: March 12, 2009; NA: August 14, 2009; PlayStation Portable: JP: October 28, 2010; NA: August 3, 2011; EU: September 3, 2011; Windows; July 25, 2016; Switch: JP: August 26, 2021; WW: August 31, 2021
- Genre: Tactical role-playing game
- Mode: Single player

Phantom Brave (Note: Japanese: ファントム・ブレイブ, Hepburn: Fantomu Bureibu) is a tactical role-playing game for the PlayStation 2 video game console, developed and published by Nippon Ichi Software. It was released on January 22, 2004 in Japan, on August 31, 2004 in North America and on February 4, 2005 in Europe. The North American release was the first game published by NIS America. The game shipped in two "editions", Normal and Special. The Special edition came with a free soundtrack and shortened instruction manual.

An expanded remake for the Wii console, titled Phantom Brave: We Meet Again, was released on March 12, 2009 in Japan. A North American release by NIS America was originally set for June, but was delayed to August 14 to include dual audio and as a result of manufacturing issues. In addition to the Wii game disc, NIS America included a DVD which contains official artwork and both animated and non-animated sprites.

The game was ported to the PlayStation Portable with added features under the title Phantom Brave: The Hermuda Triangle. Siliconera teased gamers with a "puzzlehunt", giving them the quote "Maybe that means thank you?" This puzzlehunt eventually came to be the announcement that Phantom Brave: The Hermuda Triangle was set for release in North America and Europe. While US players got both PSN and UMD versions of the game, players in Europe were only offered the downloadable PSN version.

The game was ported to Steam on July 25, 2016. The PC version has all of the added content in both We Meet Again and The Hermuda Triangle. It was also released on August 31, 2021 on Nintendo Switch and PC as part of the Prinny Presents NIS Classics Volume 1 compilation. A sequel, titled Phantom Brave: The Lost Hero, was released on January 30, 2025. A remaster of The Hermuda Triangle for PlayStation 5 was released on November 7, 2024.

== Plot ==
A typical cut scene

The protagonist of Phantom Brave is a 13-year-old girl named Marona. Marona lives on Phantom Isle in the oceanic world of Ivoire with a phantom named Ash. While he was still alive, Ash worked alongside Marona's parents Jasmine and Haze as a Chroma, a sort of bounty hunter or adventurer for hire. On an assignment on the Isle of Evil, a fragment of a malevolent being known as Sulphur attacked the group, mortally wounding them. Using the last of his life energy, Haze attempted to revive the party after the battle. However, there was only enough life left in him to bring Ash back as a phantom. Haze and Jasmine's dying wish was for Ash to watch over their then infant daughter Marona.

Marona is the only one able to see Ash in phantom form. This is primarily because of her unique ability, Chartreuse Gale. This ability not only allows her to see and interact with phantoms, but bind their souls to various objects to grant them a temporary body, using the skill "Confine". Using this power she can summon Ash and other phantoms to the world of the living to aid her in her own endeavors as a Chroma, similar to the work done by her late parents. Because she possesses the ability to see and speak with the dead, many assume that she is either controlled by or cooperates with evil spirits, and are afraid to even interact with her, much less employ her for Chroma work. In the early portions of the story, people who offer Marona employment would rescind any rewards upon completion once they discover that she was a phantom-possessed Chroma.

As she continues her Chroma work, Marona's path crosses with that of a man named Walnut. Walnut prides himself on his status as a Chroma Oxide, one who secretly follows a Chroma on their mission and steals the reward for their work. Walnut regularly tries to meddle in Chroma-related matters involving Marona, but is rarely successful. As they continue their work, Ash and Marona also meet a sickly young girl named Castille. Unable to walk for most of her life, Castille has been unable to go out into the world and make friends. However, after helping Castille's family on an assignment, Marona and Castille become friends. Marona leaves Putty (a mischievous nature spirit found on an assignment) with Castille to keep her company when Marona is unable to do so.

Signs of Sulphur returning to Ivoire in full force become more apparent. Earthquakes increase in frequency and monsters plague the land, with lesser forms of Sulphur known as Wraiths appearing to attack Ash and Marona. Marona and Walnut are forced to team up, and it is revealed that Walnut is Castile's older brother who has been stealing money from Chromas in an effort to pay Castile's hospital bills so that she can be cured of the sickness that keeps her bedridden. Ash and Marona meet more people who are aware of the signs signalling Sulpher's return and are making preparations to meet Sulpher in battle, if necessary. Among these individuals are Raphael, a renowned knight from a legion known as the Nine Swords of Ivoire, and Sprout, a renegade soldier whose family was killed by Sulphur many years earlier. While Sprout seems to side with Ash in this fight, he is hellbent on the destruction of Sulphur at all costs.

As preparations for the final battle are made, Ash and Marona return to the Isle of Evil and find Raphael is possessed by Sulphur. Marona's team of phantoms is forced to engage Raphael in a duel. After Raphael is too injured to continue and comes back to his senses, he entrusts Ash with Heliotrope, his sacred sword, for use in their battle against Sulphur. At the center of the island lies a portal from which Sulphur is entering the world, and upon the heroes' arrival they expect to engage in combat with Sulphur. However, they are intercepted by Sprout. Having gone mad from the dark power that he has stolen from the minions of Sulphur that he killed and by Sulphur's increased influence in the area, Sprout attacks Ash and Marona. When he loses to Ash he kills himself with his sword, Shiva, in an attempt to stop Sulphur within him, but Sulphur materializes anyway.

Ash and Marona battle it out with Sulphur, but in spite of their best efforts, Sulphur is merely weakened and is still attempting to enter into Ivoire. Walnut appears and sacrifices his own life to sever the portal between Ivoire and Sulphur's domain.

== Gameplay ==
Phantom Brave is a tactical role-playing game with battles that take place on an isometric board. Marona dispatches her phantom allies by confining them to objects on the field, such as trees, grass, rocks, and flowers. Different objects grant different stat bonuses to the characters that are confined to them, making it advantageous to confine certain characters to certain things. A soldier, for example, often benefits from the stat bonuses found on a rock because of his physical combat abilities, whereas a witch works better when summoned out of a flower or another object that increases its magical abilities. Up to 14 phantoms can be dispatched during any given battle, but the phantoms can only be confined to the physical world for a particular number of turns. The number of turns that a character can stay confined is based upon their class. For example, a witch can stay on the field for three turns, while a soldier lasts eight. While a high confine is desirable for continuous use of the character, a low confine number is actually advantageous if the player intends to either reuse the item to confine another phantom or take items back from the battlefield permanently, or for bomber units. Depending on their class, each phantom has a certain chance of acquiring the item he is confined to, bringing it back to Phantom Isle when the battle is won.

A typical battle sequence; Ash is attempting to attack an Amazon with the "Subtle" title.

Phantom Brave has a gridless system in which each character can move a certain number of dm in each turn. The terrain also has traction and pliability characteristics, which affect how long characters continue to slide along after they stop moving and how high they bounce when the character jumps down from a ledge. On slippery surfaces, it is possible to make the characters "ice skate" by moving very short distances (consuming few dm) and letting them slide to their destination. In addition, the hold and throw system inherited from Disgaea: Hour of Darkness allows characters to pick up and throw objects and even other characters (including allies) toward a desired location.

Unlike most tactical role-playing games, the border of the battle maps do not have barriers around their edges. Most characters and objects can be thrown off, hit off, fall off, or slip off of the field of battle and sent O.B. (out-of-bounds). Characters and objects that are O.B.'d are gone for the rest of the battle. When an enemy is O.B'd, the level of each of the remaining enemies rises by one, so the player can trade a large force of weak enemies for a smaller number of stronger ones. If the enemy's HP is reduced to zero before it is thrown out of the stage, its allies will not be granted a level up. The last enemy on the map cannot be thrown O.B., and Marona's team members do not gain levels for falling out of bounds.

All characters and weapons accumulate "mana" (a magical currency for increasing a character or weapon's abilities) whenever they kill an enemy. This mana can be spent to fuse two characters together, an item into a character, or an item to an item. Fusion increases the level cap of the beneficiary by the level of the consumed item or character. By spending mana, the player can improve equipment percentages (stat bonuses given to characters who equip the item or character) and confine percentages (bonuses to characters confined in the item on the field), and even transfer skills to the beneficiary. In Phantom Brave, weapons have a much greater effect on a character's stats than their natural affinity. The maximum obtainable character level is 9999.

While on Phantom Isle, a character class called Dungeon Monk can be asked to create a random dungeon. Some characteristics of the dungeon can be seen before creation, including the type and general number of enemies present, the floor conditions, and if the use of equipped weapons is restricted or not. Dungeons also have titles, which are applied to every enemy in the dungeon. As the floors of the dungeon are cleared, the title of the dungeon will improve. These titles can later be removed and placed on player characters or weapons to alter their stats. Random dungeons can also be retitled. A popular leveling trick is to give a random dungeon the "failure" title, allowing the player to beat hordes of high level enemies easily. Random dungeons tend to take the form of a linear series of floors, although occasionally a floor may have a special named layout (for example, "Self-Styled God" floors have a stronger enemy in the center of a terraced layout). These floors occur randomly and confer an extra bonus upon completion. Unlike in Disgaea, where to descend to the next floor one may merely move a character to a certain panel, in Phantom Brave one must defeat all the enemies present to continue. To leave a random dungeon, one must either clear every floor, or use a Dungeon Monk's Return skill, which costs money proportional to the current depth.

While between battles, Marona can return to her home; Phantom Island, where she can summon (create) new phantoms to aid her in future battles. The player starts off by being able to create characters from a limited selection of classes, but each class of enemy that is defeated in battle is added to the selection of phantoms the player may summon. Summoning phantoms requires only a nominal fee, but new phantoms always join at level 1 no matter when they are summoned. Marona's phantoms populate the island, and the player can converse with them. Many classes have a special utility on the island; Merchants sell items, Healers can recover the damage that units have sustained Fusionists can combine characters and items, Witches allow the player to reorder a character or weapon's spells and skills, and Blacksmiths combine mana with weapons to either level them up or to awaken latent skills hidden in the weapon. Phantom Isle hides several secret items and character classes, such as the Changebook, which allows the player to switch the character they explore the map with.

Phantom Brave has a series of extra maps following the main storyline. These post-game maps offer more powerful enemies and feature cameos by some members of the cast of the Disgaea games as enemies. After defeating these characters they will join the player's pool of playable characters as "phantom doubles". While the first couple of extra maps can be completed immediately after the main story, the later extra maps are very difficult and require a large amount of time invested into the game to be spent leveling characters and fusing weapons before they can be completed.

== Characters ==
- Marona

The main protagonist of the game. Marona is a 13-year-old girl who has the ability to see and communicate with phantoms, a set of abilities collectively known in-game as "Chartreuse". This power enables her to make a living as a Chroma, a kind of adventurer-for-hire, despite being at such a young age, but it also makes her feared and shunned by other people, many thinking that she is possessed. She lost her parents when she was five, but Ash, a friend of her parents and a former Chroma-turned-phantom, came back to protect Marona after the demise of her parents and himself.

- Ash

Ash is the phantom of a young man who protects Marona. When he was alive he worked alongside Marona's parents as a Chroma. After dying along with them, he found himself stuck between life and death, thanks to the efforts of Marona's father. He has since sworn to watch over and protect Marona, feeling that he owes Marona's parents for being the only one to "survive" their unfortunate demise. He is usually careful and well-intentioned, if overprotective of Marona, but is sometimes known to frighten the unwary when he accidentally speaks aloud while concealed in his phantom form. He frequently objects to Marona's selfless behavior.

- Bijou

A werewolf who impersonates Raphael of the White Wolf Army in order to steal from people who have heard of Raphael's renowned fighting prowess. He later returns in the Sand region under the influence of Sulphur, which fuels his impersonation into a belief that he really is Raphael. After he is defeated again, he is shown to be a member of the Raven clan, the Fighting Beasts, under Captain Drab. Bijou, along with many other characters that show up in the original game's story, is a playable unit in the Wii and PSP exclusive side story "Another Marona".

- Walnut

A Chroma Oxide, a person that makes a living by waiting for a Chroma to near the completion of their assigned job and then takes proof of the work's completion in order to steal the reward. Willing to do anything and step on anyone to achieve his goals, Walnut is the older brother of Marona's newfound friend Castile, and puts aside his Chroma Oxide earnings to pay for an operation for her. Walnut's power, "Psycho Burgundy", is the same power utilized by the legendary hero Scarlet the Brave, and is fueled by burning the wielder's soul to create a powerful energy. An alternate universe version of Walnut joins Marona and company as a playable character in "Another Marona", a side story that is exclusive to the Wii and PSP versions of the game. Walnut also makes an appearance in another NIS game, Soul Nomad.

- Castile

Castile is a young wheelchair-using girl, whose family was rich before spending most of their fortune on her treatments. She is kidnapped by minions of Sulphur, but rescued by Marona and Ash. Castile learns about Marona's ability to see phantoms, and meets with Ash, and she and Marona become best friends as the events of the story unfold. According to an after-game bonus map in the PS2 game Makai Kingdom: Chronicles of the Sacred Tome, Castile eventually recovers from the sickness that keeps her in bed and becomes healthy enough to fight alongside Marona, while searching for signs that her brother Walnut may still be alive.

- Sienna

Sienna is a beautiful and elegant businesswoman who owns Phantom Isle, Marona's home. She is generous and polite to a fault, but her calm demeanor holds a few secrets. Even her assistant, Murasaki, is clueless as to Sienna's true motivations, or what it is about Phantom Isle that makes it so important to her. Besides Phantom Isle, Sienna owns an immense Bottle Mail factory. It is later revealed that she was the legendary hero Scarlet the Brave before she was severely wounded in her battle with Sulphur, and that she gave up being a famed warrior to live a calm life of relative obscurity.

- Sprout

A fierce and powerful 85-year-old man whose family was slain by Sulphur's hand 30 years ago. Once the famed wielder of a holy sword, he has sworn to kill Sulphur and avenge his family, turning to the use of dark powers in order to achieve his revenge. He is the former mentor of Raphael, and one of the warriors known as the 9 Swords of Ivoire. His signature technique is the power "Dark Eboreus". An alternate version of Sprout joins the player's party in "Another Marona".

- Raphael

Leader of the White Wolf Army; a group of Ravens (a large team of professional demon slayers), Raphael is one of the warriors known as the 9 Swords of Ivoire. He is first seen in the quest to find the rainbow bird. His signature technique is called Heliotrope Blade. An alternate version of Raphael fights by Marona's side in the Wii and PSP exclusive side story, "Another Marona".

- Count Malt

A dignified old Scrabbit with a mustache that sends Marona on a search for Scarlet the Brave.

- Sulphur

The story's main antagonist and a powerful demon that periodically threatens the world of Ivoire. The very thought of his return causes chaos and widespread panic across all of Ivoire. His power possesses a number of characters throughout the game. After his defeat, Sulphur returns to Ivoire in a bonus battle on the Island of Evil. Another optional battle in the PS2 game Soul Nomad & the World Eaters reveals both how Sulfur came back to Ivoire and Walnut's fate after Phantom Brave's final battle.

=== "Another Marona" characters ===
These characters were originally introduced in Phantom Brave: We Meet Again for the Nintendo Wii (and its PSP port, Phantom Brave: The Hermuda Triangle), in the new campaign "Another Marona".

- Carona

The Marona of an alternate reality, she shares the same phantom-related Chartreuse powers that the original Marona has. In order to avoid confusion amongst the people of this reality's world she goes by the name 'Carona' instead. Whereas Marona is both carefree and optimistic, Carona is usually serious and pessimistic, although she does show a twisted sense of humor. Her goals and intent are both unknown, and she mostly keeps to herself when she's not training Marona and company for their upcoming battle with Sulpher. Carona appears in Ivoire just after a mysterious veil of darkness claimed the lives of all of the peoples of Ivoire, save Marona.

- God Eringa

A powerful character that appears alongside Carona, this bearded mushroom creature claims to be God. He entices Marona and company to work in his interest under the proposal that if they can defeat Sulfer within a certain number of days, he will revive all of the people who were felled by the darkness that swallowed Ivoire. During the final battle of "Another Marona" it is revealed that he is actually the fabled Merchant of Death, and was responsible for the spreading darkness that killed everyone.

=== Other characters ===
Four characters that originate from the Disgaea series (Laharl, Etna, Flonne, and Vyers) become playable characters upon completing certain post-game content. Myao, one of Marjoly's henchwomen from the Marl Kingdom series game Rhapsody: A Musical Adventure, also makes a playable cameo.

== Reception ==
Reception

Aggregate score
Aggregator	Score			
Aggregator	PC	PS2	PSP	Wii
Metacritic	81/100	81/100	65/100	76/100

Review scores
Publication	Score			
Publication	PC	PS2	PSP	Wii
Electronic Gaming Monthly	N/A	8.5/10	N/A	N/A
Eurogamer	N/A	9/10	N/A	N/A
Famitsu	N/A	33/40	32/40	N/A
Game Informer	N/A	8/10	N/A	N/A
GamePro	N/A	4.5/5	3.5/5	N/A
GameRevolution	N/A	N/A	B−	N/A
GameSpot	N/A	7.5/10	N/A	7/10
GameSpy	N/A	4/5	N/A	N/A
IGN	N/A	8.6/10	N/A	N/A
Nintendo Power	N/A	N/A	N/A	8/10
Official U.S. PlayStation Magazine	N/A	4.5/5	N/A	N/A
Pocket Gamer	N/A	N/A	3/5	N/A
RPGamer	N/A	4/5	2.5/5	3/5
RPGFan	84%	84%	N/A	76%

The game received "generally favorable reviews" on all platforms except the PSP version, which received "mixed" reviews, according to the review aggregation website Metacritic. Nintendo Power gave the Wii version a favorable review, nearly two months before its U.S. release date. Edge gave the original game a score of seven out of ten, saying, "Nippon Ichi's disregard for the cult of stagnated updates is at once exhilarating and unnerving. It's exhilarating because it leaves the player wondering exactly where these craftsmen of the strategy minutiae will go next, and it's unnerving because Phantom Brave's reworking is a bridge too far for all but the most dedicated of videogame strategists." In Japan, Famitsu gave it a score of 33 out of 40 for the original game, and 32 out of 40 for the PSP version.

Michael Lafferty of GameZone gave the original game a score of 7.8 out of 10, calling it "A mixed bag that goes from simple (and a tad frustrating) to thoughtfully compelling in the combat." Later, however, Michael Knutson gave the Wii version 7.9 out of 10, calling it "a very interesting game that players will love to get their hands on. This game offers numerous hours of playtime and is one of the most 'hardcore' games on the Nintendo Wii. Even though this game has a few pitfalls, overall players will enjoy the experience it offers."
