= Disgaea =

- Disgaea 3 logo for English version of the series
- Genre: Tactical role-playing game
- Developer: Nippon Ichi Software
- Publishers: JP: Nippon Ichi Software; NA: Atlus USA, NIS America; EU: NIS Europe, Koei, Square Enix Europe; AU: Ubisoft Australia, AFA Interactive
- Platforms: Microsoft Windows, MacOS, Linux, Nintendo DS, Nintendo Switch, Nintendo Switch 2, PlayStation 2, PlayStation 3, PlayStation 4, PlayStation 5, PlayStation Portable, PlayStation Vita, Android, iOS
- First release: Disgaea: Hour of Darkness; January 30, 2003
- Latest release: Disgaea Mayhem; January 29, 2026

Disgaea (魔界戦記ディスガイア, Makai Senki Disugaia; lit. 'Hell Chronicles Disgaea') is a tactical role-playing video game series created and developed by Nippon Ichi. The series debuted in Japan on January 30, 2003, with Disgaea: Hour of Darkness, later re-released as Disgaea: Afternoon of Darkness and Disgaea DS. One of Nippon Ichi's most popular franchises, it has branched off into both a manga and anime series. The Disgaea games are known for complex gameplay, extremely high maximum stats and humorous dialogue. The Disgaea series has shipped 5 million copies as of 2021.

== Common elements ==
=== Gameplay ===
Each Disgaea game consists of a number of missions that the player undertakes from a central hub. In the hub, the player can manage equipment and team members, heal their party, and other functions. When the player is prepared, they can then travel to the next available mission as well as replay any mission they have already completed. Missions are usually arranged in a number of chapters with cutscenes before and after to advance the plot.

Each mission requires the player to complete an objective, all missions can be completed by defeating all the enemy forces. The mission takes place on an isometric grid-based board with spaces at various heights. The player and the computer alternate turns. During the player's turn, they can summon members of their party from a starting point, up to ten. Each character, once on the board, can move and then perform an action, including melee attacks and special abilities. Once a character has performed an action, they may no longer move that turn unless they attack before moving. The player can move as many characters as desired and plan their actions at a time, then issue an "Execute" command to carry out those actions. If the player has characters that can still move and perform actions at this time, they can do so, otherwise, they will end their turn. The computer opponents then perform their actions. When the player successfully completes a mission, they are given bonus items based on their overall bonus score, which is earned through combo attacks, special attacks, and other features of the game.

The player can arrange to have allies next to each other to fight a foe with a chance to launch a combo attack, which can do more damage and boost the mission's scoring meter. Players can also have characters lift and throw other characters or objects on the level for various effects: for example, a character can throw another character to an empty space to allow that second character to move farther than if on foot, or certain monsters called Prinnies can be thrown at others to cause explosive damage. It is possible for characters to pick up a character that is already carrying another character, and so forth, allowing for one character to move within a single turn to the far side of the map. However, any character that is still carrying another character at the end of the turn will take damage. While a character is holding others they can attack, when this is done each character adds to the damage.

Across some boards are glowing colored spaces which are either red, green, blue, yellow, purple, or cyan, and special objects called "Geo Symbols" which are either null, red, green, blue, yellow, or purple. When these are placed on a colored field, they impart a bonus or penalty to all battle participants on the same colored field; such bonuses can also stack if multiple Geo Symbols are on the same field. A character can destroy a Geo Symbol which will cause all the field spaces it affects to cause some damage to the characters on them as they turn to another color determined by the destroyed Geo Symbol. It is possible to arrange a chain of these effects, with each chain increasing the amount of damage earned and increasing the bonus score for the mission. As with characters, Geo Symbols can also be lifted and thrown to affect the board's bonuses.

In addition to maintaining their party at the central hub, the player can create new characters to the party based on experience each character earned in battle, or, with enough experience, attempt to alter the features of the central hub, such as having better weapon or armor at the stores. This itself involves convincing the Dark Assembly to agree to such changes, and it is possible to initiate combat in the same manner as the missions to convince the creature to see otherwise. There is also an Item World gateway; here, the player can select any item in the party's inventory and enter it. The Item World for an item is randomly generated but depends on a number of factors based on the item itself such as its rarity or power. By descending through the Item World, each level similar to one of the main missions featuring a random map and a number of creatures as well as an exit portal to the next level, the player can improve the abilities of the item as well as free Guardians that live in the item. These Guardians impart certain benefits to the item, such as increased in attack or defense values, and once they are freed, they can be moved between items freely.

The game can be played through multiple times, as each game features multiple endings. However, each time, the player's party, with all characters, items, and abilities, are carried over. This New Game Plus allows the player to develop extremely powerful characters, approaching the maximum character level of 9999 and 186,000 combined levels in reincarnation through repeated playthroughs.

The series exists for the moment only in Japanese, English and French languages.

=== Setting ===
All Disgaea games take place mostly in the "Netherworld", a parallel universe inhabited by demons where moral values are reversed from those of humans. Multiple Netherworlds exist, each with their own Overlord. Other areas include the human world, shown to possess a futuristic level of technology in Hour of Darkness, and "Celestia", a heavenly realm inhabited by angels. Rather than being purely good or purely evil, inhabitants of the Netherworld and Celestia possess human-like qualities, but are swayed far more towards either moral extreme. It is shown in Disgaea 4 that both the Netherworld and Celestia are dependent on energy from the human world for survival, and that if humans begin to fear themselves, more than they would fear demons and monsters, the Netherworld will fall apart.

=== Recurring characters ===
Most major characters from previous games make a cameo appearance, or lend their services to characters in later ones. The main characters of the first Disgaea game Laharl, Etna and Flonne are playable in every subsequent main title so far. Due to the large number of different Netherworlds being magically connected, characters from other Nippon Ichi games and series, such as La Pucelle: Tactics, Marl Kingdom, Makai Kingdom, Phantom Brave, Soul Nomad, Z.H.P. Unlosing Ranger VS Darkdeath Evilman, The Witch and the Hundred Knight, Battle Princess of Arcadias and The Guided Fate Paradox have also appeared in Disgaea games.

Baal, the most powerful enemy in the Disgaea series, is a legendary overlord that appears as a recurring boss throughout the different games. Known as the Lord of Terror, he is a collection of evil souls that can transfer into other bodies when defeated. He often appears in a towering, monstrous form, though he is forced into more diminutive ones after being defeated.

The Prism Rangers are a troupe of gag characters heavily inspired by the protagonists of the Super Sentai/Power Rangers universes. Each of the members are named after the colors of the rainbow with the word Prism preceding it, with their leader being "Prism Red". The Prism Rangers tend to be portrayed as weak, having been taken down in one shot or being unable to do the slightest bit of damage to their opponent.

Asagi is a character meant to be the main character in a development hell Nippon Ichi title, Makai Wars. She constantly attempts to become the star of other games.

Pleinair Allaprima (プレネール・アラプリマ, Purenēru Arapurima) is a mascot character for the artist and character designer of the series, Takehito Harada. She makes various appearances throughout the series. She is typically portrayed as a petite, blue-haired girl with red eyes, wearing a red ribbon, a white dress, white stockings, and sometimes glasses. She is also known for being mute, with characters at times referencing her refusal (or perhaps inability) to speak; This can be used to comical effect such as when she is a co-anchor, despite herself, for a Netherworld news show that plays between chapters in Disgaea 2. She is often accompanied by a stuffed rabbit named "Usagi-san" and a stuffed shark named "Same-san".

=== Prinnies ===
Prinny

Prinnies (プリニー, Purini) are common servants, and one of the protagonists as well as enemies in the series. They resemble small pouch-wearing penguins with disproportionately small bat wings and two peg legs for feet. Their personalities are upbeat, and they are required to use the word "dood" at the end of their sentences to signify their status ("-ssu" in the Japanese dialogue). While Prinnies use machetes as their primary weapons, they are also able to use "Prinny Bombs" from their pouch and fire a laser called the "Pringer Beam". They are created when a human who has led a worthless life or committed a mortal sin in life dies, leading to the soul being sewn into the body of a Prinny. After being reborn, they serve as maids and domestic servants in Celestia, where their good deeds lead to their reincarnation, or as servants and slaves (and sometimes cannon fodder) in the Netherworld, where they obtain money towards their reincarnation, often under lords who treat them horribly for little pay.

Prinnies explode when thrown due to the human soul being unstable, and thus, a jostling, such as being tossed, will cause them to do as such. Prinnies are also mass-produced with demon souls, which leaves them stable. During a certain time of the year a red moon appears in the sky of the Underworld; when this happens, all the Prinnies meet together and Prinnies who have earned enough money are allowed to reincarnate.

== Media ==
=== Games ===
Timeline of release years
2002	La Pucelle: Tactics
2003	Hour of Darkness
2004	Mugen Keitai Disgaea
2004	Phantom Brave
2005	Makai Kingdom: Chronicles of the Sacred Tome
2006	2: Cursed Memories
2006	Afternoon of Darkness
2007	Soul Nomad & the World Eaters
2008	3: Absence of Justice
2008	Prinny: Can I Really Be the Hero?
2008	DS
2009	2: Dark Hero Days
2009	Infinite
2010	Prinny 2: Dawn of Operation Panties, Dood!
2011	4: A Promise Unforgotten
2012	3: Absence of Detention
2013	D2: A Brighter Darkness
2014	4: A Promise Revisited
2015	5: Alliance of Vengeance
2016	PC
2017	2 PC
2017	5 Complete
2018	Makai Wars
2018	1 Complete
2019	4 Complete+
2019	RPG
2020	1 Complete (iOS/Android)
2021	6: Defiance of Destiny
2022	6: Complete
2023	7: Vows of the Virtueless
2024	7 Complete
2025
2026	Disgaea Mayhem

The first two Disgaea installments were released for the PlayStation 2. The series debuted in Japan with Disgaea: Hour of Darkness in 2003 on the PlayStation 2 and has since been re-released on the PlayStation Portable as Disgaea: Afternoon of Darkness, Nintendo DS as Disgaea DS and the PlayStation 4 and Nintendo Switch as Disgaea 1 complete with new content. It was known for many uncommon elements previously unseen in the strategy RPG genre, such as complex gameplay, extremely high maximum stats and a maximum level of 9999, and humorous dialogue. Disgaea 2: Cursed Memories, released for the PlayStation 2 in 2006 in Japan, has been re-released on the PlayStation Portable under the title Disgaea 2: Dark Hero Days with new content. Both of these games were later ported to the PC as Disgaea PC in 2016, and Disgaea 2 PC in 2017 respectively. Both are based on the PlayStation Portable versions, with additional content and redone graphics. The series then moved on to the PlayStation 3 for Disgaea 3: Absence of Justice, released in Japan in 2008, and was re-released on the PlayStation Vita as Disgaea 3: Absence of Detention in 2012. Disgaea 4: A Promise Unforgotten was released in Japan in 2011 and re-released on the PlayStation Vita as Disgaea 4: A Promise Revisited in 2014. A direct sequel to the first game, Disgaea D2: A Brighter Darkness was released for the PlayStation 3 in 2013. Disgaea 5: Alliance of Vengeance was released in 2015, moving the series to the PlayStation 4, and was ported to the Nintendo Switch as Disgaea 5 Complete in 2017. The next game, Disgaea 6: Defiance of Destiny, was announced on September 17, 2020 and both were released on the PlayStation 4 and Nintendo Switch and most notably, 3D models are now used for the characters, which is a first in the series and the standard maximum level of 9999 increased to 99,999,999. Disgaea 6 Complete was released for PlayStation 4, PlayStation 5, and PC through Steam in June 2022. Disgaea 7: Vows of the Virtueless was announced in August 2022, and was released in Japan on January 26, 2023 for PlayStation 4, PlayStation 5, and Nintendo Switch.

Re-released Disgaea titles have the tradition of featuring an alternate story-line to freshen up gameplay. In the first two re-releases, Etna Mode in Disgaea: Afternoon of Darkness and Axel Mode in Disgaea 2: Dark Hero Days, feature alternate story-lines with new main characters.

Disgaea has also spawned several spin-off titles. The first such spin-off, Mugen Keitai Disgaea was released in 2004 as a Japanese mobile game. Makai Kingdom: Chronicles of the Sacred Tome in 2005, released on the PlayStation 2, starred Lord Zetta as an overlord of an alternate Netherworld with gameplay similar to the original Disgaea series. The Prinnies were then featured in the side-scrolling adventure game, Prinny: Can I Really Be the Hero? in 2008 and Prinny 2: Dawn of Operation Panties, Dood! in 2010, for the PlayStation Portable. The first Android-based game, Disgaea: Netherworld Unbound, was released in 2011 as a free-to-play game with optional paid-content available.

The PlayStation Portable title, Disgaea Infinite, is a visual novel in the same setting as Disgaea: Hour of Darkness, and the story-line of a Prinny being ordered to investigate the attempted assassination of Laharl. Gameplay is very simple compared to other Disgaea titles, with the primary interactive element being the ability to switch characters in order to solve a mystery.

=== Anime ===
Makai Senki Disgaea is an anime series based on the video game Disgaea: Hour of Darkness. Makai Senki Disgaea follows the same general plot as the game, but with several alterations to character roles and the chronology of events. This anime ran for 12 episodes from April 5th to June 26th 2006.

=== Manga ===
While not necessarily canon, a Disgaea manga, Makai Senki Disgaea, illustrated by Arashi Shindo, follows the basic storyline. Many events in the manga, while similar, have been altered completely and the humor is more offbeat (e.g. Laharl, Etna, and Flonne believe that Mid Boss may be a pedophile due to his recurring presence among the three). Many characters also appear to have different personalities (e.g. on occasion, Lamington will be seen baking a cake). The art style is also very different as many of the characters appear somewhat more mature and the art is very shōjo-like. Broccoli Books released the manga in September 2006. Makai Senki Disgaea 2 ran from 2006–07 in Japan, and Makai Senki Disgaea 3: School of Devils has been ongoing in Japan since 2009.

=== Merchandise ===
Nippon Ichi Software's online store sells various merchandise such as several different Prinny plushies, and in Japan Nippon Ichi has released several pieces of Prinny merchandise and has used kigurumi of the characters to promote the release of Prinny: Can I Really be the Hero? in Akihabara. Additionally four Prinny avatars for the PlayStation 3's PlayStation Home were also released for sale, modeled after the different unique Prinnies in the original Disgaea.

=== Novels ===
A set of novels written by Sow Kamishiro and illustrated by Chou Niku (although they were aided by Takehito Harada in the beginning). These novels begin with a novelization of the first game and then continue the story ten years later. The novels introduce many new characters including Laharl's relatives, Flonne's family, and Gordon and Jennifer's daughter. The novels take place in a separate canon from the mainline games, and are unlikely to be revisited by Nippon-Ichi due to the ending of their contract with Kadokawa books. There are 22 Disgaea-related novels:

- Disgaea: Enter the Maoh - Retelling of the first Disgaea
- Disgaea: Revelations - Original story about Laharl's extended family
- Disgaea: Returned - Original story primarily about Flonne's extended family
- Disgaea: On Love (Parts 1 & 2) - Original story about Etna & Flonne time travelling to meet Laharl's mother in the past
- Disgaea: Battle of Maohs - Original story involving the casts of Disgaea and Makai Kingdom
- Disgaea 2: Mask of the Maoh (Parts 1 & 2) - Retelling of Disgaea 2
- Disgaea: Heart of the Maoh - Original story involving Laharl's mother
- Disgaea: School of the Maoh - Original story involving the characters from multiple games attending a school for demons
- Disgaea 3: Brave and the Maoh (Parts 1 & 2) - Retelling of Disgaea 3
- Disgaea: Three Dash! - Original story involving the casts of Disgaea 1, 3, and Makai Kingdom
- Disgaea: War of Prinny - Retelling of Prinny: Can I Really Be the Hero, Dood?
- Disgaea 4: Power of Iwashi - Retelling of Disgaea 4
- Disgaea: Maoh of the Dead - Original story involving Laharl, Etna, and Flonne filming a zombie movie
- Disgaea D2: Revisit - Retelling of Disgaea D2
- Phantom Brave: A Small Wish, Sulphur's Counterattack, & Return of the Brave - 3-part Retelling of Phantom Brave
- Phantom Kingdom: Tales of the Universe's Strongest Overlords - Retelling of Makai Kingdom
- Puppet Princess of Marl Kingdom: An Angel's Song of Love - Retelling of Rhapsody: A Musical Adventure

== Development ==
The gameplay mechanic of throwing characters was developed as a "strong and unique" aspect of gameplay that would attract players. New gameplay ideas were added to each game until the "majority of staffers" were "not sure" whether they were necessary, hence its complexity.

== Reception ==
Aggregate review scores
Game	Metacritic
Disgaea: Hour of Darkness	(NDS) 82/100 (NS) 76/100 (PC) 74/100 (PS2) 84/100 (PS4) 83/100 (PSP) 87/100
Disgaea 2: Cursed Memories	(PC) 81/100 (PS2) 84/100 (PSP) 83/100
Disgaea 3: Absence of Justice	(PS3) 78/100 (Vita) 78/100
Disgaea 4: A Promise Unforgotten	(NS) 85/100 (PS3) 80/100 (PS4) 83/100 (Vita) 82/100
Disgaea D2: A Brighter Darkness	(PS3) 74/100
Disgaea 5: Alliance of Vengeance	(NS) 81/100 (PS4) 80/100
Disgaea 6: Defiance of Destiny	(NS) 73/100 (PC) 71/100 (PS5) 68/100
Disgaea 7: Vows of the Virtueless	(NS) 83/100 (PS5) 84/100

The Disgaea series has been received positively by reviewers, particularly praising the amount of content, solid battle system and humor while criticizing the large learning curve and dated graphics. The highest score was received by Disgaea: Afternoon of Darkness for PSP, at a score of 87% at Gamerankings and Metacritic. Disgaea 6: Defiance of Destiny for PlayStation 5 received the lowest average score of the series, at around 68% at Metacritic, with reviewers saying that while its accessibility is among the highest for any Disgaea title, that is the only main factor in its limited success. It has sold rather poorly in its first week by the standards of the series.

Prinnies have been described as some of the most notable characters in the Disgaea series, and the mascots of the series. In a preview of the upcoming game starring the character in PlayStation: The Official Magazine, Chris Hudak asked "What better sign that you've warmed the cold hearts of videogamers worldwide than to have your own beloved, signature character?", additionally comparing in great detail the Prinny to fellow video game mascots Mario, Sonic the Hedgehog, and Dragon Quest's Slime. PSX Extreme described them as "one of the most recognizable – and curiously lovable – characters" in the Disgaea series. They are featured strongly in Nippon Ichi's marketing, such as the annual Tipsy Prinny press events. The third event, held in the Zebulon Bar San Francisco on June 5, 2008, featured green prinnies suspended from every banister and light fitting.
