= Disgaea 2 =

2006 video game

- Developer: Nippon Ichi Software
- Publishers: JP: Nippon Ichi Software; NA: NIS America; PAL: Koei; EU: NIS Europe (PSP); AU: NIS America (PSP); NA: SCEA (PSN)
- Director: Shinichi Ikeda
- Producer: Sōhei Niikawa
- Designers: Masahiro Yamamoto; Shinichi Ikeda
- Composer: Tenpei Sato
- Series: Disgaea
- Platforms: PlayStation 2; PlayStation Portable; Linux; macOS; Windows
- Release: February 23, 2006: PlayStation 2; JP: February 23, 2006; NA: August 29, 2006; EU: November 3, 2006; AU: November 23, 2006; NA: January 22, 2013 (PSN); PlayStation Portable; JP: March 26, 2009; NA: September 8, 2009; EU: February 5, 2010; AU: February 18, 2010; Linux, macOS, Windows; WW: January 30, 2017
- Genre: Tactical role-playing
- Mode: Single-player

Disgaea 2: Cursed Memories (Note: Japanese: 魔界戦記ディスガイア2, Hepburn: Makai Senki Disugaia Tsū; lit. 'Netherworld Battle Chronicle: Disgaea 2') is a tactical role-playing game developed and published by Nippon Ichi Software for the PlayStation 2 video game console. Disgaea 2 is the sequel to 2003's Disgaea: Hour of Darkness and was released for the PlayStation 2. It is also the predecessor to Disgaea 3: Absence of Justice for the PlayStation 3.

Unlike Nippon Ichi's previous games and the Japanese and European releases of Disgaea: Hour of Darkness, Disgaea 2 is on DVD-ROM and has an animated opening movie.

It was re-released for the PlayStation Portable as Disgaea 2 Portable (Note: Japanese: 魔界戦記ディスガイア 2 PORTABLE, Hepburn: Makai Senki Disugaia 2 Pōtaburu) in Japan and as Disgaea 2: Dark Hero Days in North America and Europe. It was re-released on PC via Linux, macOS, and Windows in 2017.

== Gameplay ==
Disgaea 2 is divided into 13 chapters. Each chapter begins with cut scenes to explain Adell's next mission. Players then take control of Adell in his hometown of Holt. The town serves as a gateway to story maps, side quests, the dark council, and the item world. At the beginning of each chapter, a new area is unlocked. Each area consists of multiple maps which must be beaten to advance to the next chapter. Talking to the gatekeeper of Holt will give players the option of exploring the new area or repeating any maps that have been beaten. Many maps also have cut scenes. Scenes at the beginning and end of each chapter cannot be skipped.

The gameplay in Disgaea 2 builds directly upon that of Disgaea: Hour of Darkness; players control a party of characters to do battle on a 3D isometric grid map.

The Item World game mode returns from Disgaea: Hour of Darkness. Players can select any item in the party's inventory and enter it. The levels within are randomly generated, and the difficulty of enemies depends on the item's rarity or power. There are two ways to descend through the Item World: by defeating all enemies on a given level, or by using exit portals located somewhere on each level. Special enemies, called Guardians, can be freed by defeating them, imparting certain benefits to the item, such as increased attack or defense values. Once they are freed, they can be moved between items freely. The further a player descends through a given item's Item World, the higher the stat bonuses it will receive.

== Plot ==
Fifteen years ago, a powerful Overlord by the name of Zenon appeared in Veldime and cursed its human population. Since then, all its inhabitants have become demons and are to remain that way if the curse was not broken. However, a young man named Adell was the only human unaffected by the curse. Wanting to save his family and return them back to their true form, Adell decides to seek out Overlord Zenon and defeat him. Adell's mother tries to summon Zenon and fails, but instead summons Rozalin, Zenon's daughter. They later go on a quest to find Zenon and return Rozalin to him, and then defeat him so that the curse would be lifted, making his family and the rest of the world human again.

== Reception ==
Reception

Aggregate scores
Aggregator	Score
GameRankings	PS2: 85%
Metacritic	PS2: 84/100; PSP: 83/100; PC: 81/100

Review scores
Publication	Score
1Up.com	C+
GameSpot	8.2/10
GameSpy	3.5/5
GamesRadar+	8/10
IGN	8.5/10

Award
Publication	Award
IGN	Best PS2 Strategy Game of 2006

Disgaea 2 has received generally favorable reviews, obtaining an aggregate score of 84/100 on Metacritic. It received a mention in Gaming Target's selection of '52 Games We'll Still Be Playing From 2006' and won "IGN's Best of 2006" prize of "Best PS2 Strategy Game".

== Re-releases ==
The official website for Disgaea 2 Portable opened on December 29, 2008. It was released in Japan on March 26, 2009. NIS America announced that they were publishing the PlayStation Portable version under the name Disgaea 2: Dark Hero Days. It was released in the United States on September 8, 2009.

The re-release features bonus material over the original, including an expanded playable character line-up(including three of the main cast from the sequel Disgaea 3: Absence of Justice; Mao, Raspberyl and Mr. Champloo), an 'Axel Mode' storyline, more creatable monsters and more powerful versions of existing spells. Features from Disgaea 3 are also introduced, including an enhanced Magichange system, Pass & Toss and Level Spheres in the Item World.

A PlayStation 2 Classic Edition of Disgaea 2 was released for U.S. PSN on January 22, 2013.

A port of the game for PCs titled Disgaea 2 PC was released on January 30, 2017, and includes all content from the PS2 and PSP versions, including all three DLC characters that were removed from the western release, along with an updated interface and support for mouse and keyboard.

== See also ==
- Disgaea: Hour of Darkness
- Nippon Ichi
- Tactical role-playing games
