= Makai Kingdom: Chronicles of the Sacred Tome =

2005 video game

- PAL region PlayStation 2 version cover art
- Developer: Nippon Ichi Software
- Publisher: Nippon Ichi Software: EU: Koei
- Director: Shinichi Ikeda
- Producer: Sōhei Niikawa
- Designer: Yoshitsuna Kobayashi
- Programmer: Masahiro Yamamoto
- Artist: Takehito Harada (character)
- Writer: Sōhei Niikawa
- Series: Disgaea
- Platforms: PlayStation 2, PlayStation Portable, Microsoft Windows, Nintendo Switch
- Release: March 17, 2005: PlayStation 2; JP: March 17, 2005; NA: July 26, 2005; EU: October 28, 2005 PlayStation Portable; JP: October 6, 2011 Nintendo Switch; JP: March 31, 2022; NA: May 10, 2022; EU: May 13, 2022 Windows; WW: May 10, 2022
- Genre: Tactical RPG
- Mode: Single-player

Makai Kingdom: Chronicles of the Sacred Tome (Note: Known in Japan as Phantom Kingdom (Japanese: ファントム・キングダム, Hepburn: Fantomu Kingudamu)) is a tactical role-playing game developed and published by Nippon Ichi Software. It was initially released for PlayStation 2 on March 17, 2005 in Japan, July 26 in North America, and October 28 in Europe. An enhanced port of the game, Phantom Kingdom Portable, was released for the PlayStation Portable in Japan on October 6, 2011. The game was later ported to Windows as Makai Kingdom: Reclaimed and Rebound, and to Nintendo Switch as part of the Prinny Presents NIS Classics Volume 2 compilation, with those versions released worldwide on May 10, 2022.

A spin-off of the Disgaea series, the game follows a godlike being, Overlord Zetta, after he attempts to avert the destruction of his Netherworld and, due to his foolishness, is forced to confine his soul to the Sacred Tome, a reality-controlling book. He is forced to seek out other Overlords for assistance in reconstructing his Netherworld. The PSP, Windows, and Switch versions also contain Petta Mode, a route featuring Zetta's future daughter, Petta, who has gone back in time. The game was praised by critics for its humorous dialog, story, and deep gameplay, although it was criticized by some as being too similar to previous games from the publisher.

== Plot ==
=== Setting ===
The main characters of Makai Kingdom are Overlords, beings of godlike power who rule over pocket universes called Netherworlds that also appear in the Disgaea series.

=== Characters ===
The protagonist is Zetta, a self-proclaimed "Bad-ass Freakin' Overlord" who is, to his knowledge, the strongest to ever exist. One of his main allies is Dark Lord Valvoga, an intimidating-looking being resembling a generic "final boss" who consists of three separate minds, the cowardly Mickey, the sultry Ophelia, and Dryzen, a crazed dragon skull. Other characters include Pram the Oracle, a young overlord who can see the future, Alexander, a God of Destruction who wields thunder-based powers and considers Zetta his rival, Demon Overlord Seedle, a former samurai, Salome the Traitor, Zetta's former pupil, and Trenia, a mysterious girl with an unknown identity who can be seen wandering around space seemingly at random.

=== Story ===
After the destruction of his Netherworld is prophesied by Pram the Oracle, Overlord Zetta travels to the Forbidden Library to prevent it. Finding the Sacred Tome, a book that controls reality, Zetta finds a passage claiming that his own stupidity would be the downfall of his Netherworld. Infuriated, he burns the book, only to remember immediately afterwards that destroying the book would destroy his world in a self-fulfilling prophecy. He quickly responds by confining his soul to the Sacred Tome and ventures to rewrite his world into existence by having the other Overlords of Netherworlds write wishes within his pages.

After fighting through a number of different Netherworlds, Zetta is supposedly fatally cursed by a godlike being known as The One. Soon after, his lost former pupil, Salome, asks him to marry her. Traveling to her Netherworld, Zetta fatally wounds Salome in battle, but she reveals that she was already dying beforehand. The true strongest Overlord, Salome was giving all of her mana to Zetta in secret due to her unrequited love for him. Realizing this, Zetta asks Pram to revive Salome, but she is thwarted by the vengeful Overlord Seedle. Alexander defeats Seedle, but Zetta is left without hope of reviving Salome or returning to his body.

Trenia reveals herself to be the spirit of the Sacred Tome that was exiled from the book when Zetta put himself into it. Believing that Zetta has learned his lesson and become a more humble person, she confines herself back into the Sacred Tome, giving him back his body and full power. Zetta then proceeds to revive Salome using his immense power. Meanwhile, it is revealed that the curse of The One is fake, and that the true The One is actually Ophelia.

== Gameplay ==
The gameplay is somewhat similar to the gameplay found in Phantom Brave and Disgaea: Hour of Darkness, other games created by Nippon Ichi. The characters summoned in battle have freedom to move within a circle set by the characters' movement points. Victory is achieved by scoring a set number of points, which are given by interacting with items on the map, discovering extension maps, and eliminating enemies. Several of the classes from Disgaea: Hour of Darkness exist in this game as well, such as Warrior and Mage, but some of the equivalents of previous classes are different. Some classes also have distinctions between sexes.

There are a variety of weapon types, each with their own expansive sets. Characters can equip armor and various other accessories to aid in combat. Each class has four weapon types in which they are proficient, and can learn new moves to use in combat as characters master the weapons.

Vehicles are a new addition from previous Nippon Ichi games. They are similar to moving, battle-capable buildings. They vary in size, shape, and purpose, but are generally faster than travelling on foot. Vehicles can damage opponents and can level-up, but levelling a vehicle is different from levelling a character. Leveling up high ranked vehicles is difficult, and in actuality, impossible to raise them to 9999, as the cost will effectively be more than the player can ever make.

Many of maps are randomly generated. While, in many cases, the first map in a storyline mission is pre-set, the "extensions" to the map are often randomly generated. The randomly generated maps creates the potential to have vastly different situations even when replaying the same map. Within the game, there are two separate types of extensions: "Locked" and "Secret". While both extensions can be revealed by throwing something out of bounds into the extension, "Locked" extensions can also be unlocked by destroying a specific unit on the field, which is marked with an icon saying "Key".

Once an extension is revealed, there may occasionally be "special events" which occur as soon as the extension is unlocked. While many special events simply affect the enemies that appear in the extension, others will paralyze everyone on the battlefield, put everyone to sleep, or other effects.

== Reception ==
Reception

Aggregate score
Aggregator	Score
Metacritic	77/100

The game received an aggregate score of 77/100 on Metacritic, indicating "generally favorable reviews".
