= The Liar Princess and the Blind Prince =

2018 video game

- Packaging artwork
- Developer: Nippon Ichi Software
- Publisher: Nippon Ichi Software
- Platforms: Nintendo Switch; PlayStation 4 PlayStation Vita iOS; Android; Microsoft Windows
- Release: PlayStation Vita: JP: 31 May 2018; Nintendo Switch, PlayStation 4: JP: 31 May 2018; WW: 12 February 2019; Android, iOS: JP: 29 May 2020; Microsoft Windows: WW: 11 March 2026
- Genre: Action-adventure
- Mode: Single-player

The Liar Princess and the Blind Prince (Japanese: 嘘つき姫と盲目王子, Hepburn: Usotsuki Hime to Mōmoku Ōji) is an action-adventure game developed and published by Nippon Ichi Software. It was released in Japan in May 2018 for Nintendo Switch, PlayStation 4, and PlayStation Vita, and was released in western territories in February 2019 only for Switch and PlayStation 4. iOS and Android mobile ports were released in Japan in May 2020.

== Gameplay ==
The Liar Princess and the Blind Prince is an action-adventure game played from a side-scrolling perspective. The player is a wolf who can freely shapeshift into a princess under most circumstances and must do so to properly escort the prince through the levels. In princess form, the player can hold hands with the prince in order to bring him alongside her and give him simple instructions to perform, such as jumping or telling him to walk left or right for a way. However, the princess is also more vulnerable as she cannot survive falls from high areas and attacks from creatures. In wolf form, the player is able to protect the prince from the forest creatures and human enemies in combat, either by directly attacking the creatures or by utilizing the environment in order to do so. The wolf can also survive high falls and withstand attacks from creatures. There are also environmental puzzles in the forest, such as platforms that react to weight, small areas that only the princess can fit through, or heavy objects that block the road and can only be broken by the strength of the wolf. The prince can also hold and place certain objects for the princess while the player guides him to the right position. There are several objects that only the prince can hold, such as fire lanterns.

== Plot ==
Every night, on a tall cliff deep within a monster-filled forest, a large wolf creature sings to the night sky. Her beautiful voice soon attracts the attention of a young prince from the kingdom surrounded by the forest, who begins visiting the forest every night to listen to her. Initially wary of the human, the wolf begins to enjoy the prince's attention, but is afraid of letting the prince see her monstrous form. One night, the prince climbs up the cliff to see her and the wolf accidentally blinds him when she impulsively tries to cover his eyes, causing him to fall off the cliff despite her attempts to rescue him. After being saved by a guard, the prince is imprisoned by his parents, who view his wound as shameful.

A few days later, feeling guilty, the wolf sneaks into the castle and tells the prince that she is a princess from a neighboring kingdom, and decides to take the prince to visit the Witch of the Forest. Realizing she cannot take him as she is, the wolf seeks out the Witch, a mystical being who can grant wishes for a price, and offers her singing voice for a human form. The Witch accepts, allowing the wolf to transform into a princess, although the spell is negated under moonlight. Returning to the castle and freeing the prince, the wolf (assuming the form of the princess) begins a quest to guide him to the Witch in order to wish for his eyes to be healed.

Over the course of the journey, the two begin to bond. One night, while the princess is handing the prince a flower, moonlight falls on her hand and it returns to its original form. The prince immediately recognizes the feel of the arm that blinded him, and the resulting falling out causes a massive forest fire. The flames eventually reach and consume most of the Witch's collection of payments for all the wishes she had granted; infuriated, the Witch transforms into a massive monster and begins rampaging. After saving the prince from the fire, the princess and prince work together to calm the Witch down and apologize. Still furious, the Witch nonetheless accepts the princess's wish to heal the prince's eyesight, but demands both her ability to transform and her memories of the prince as payment. The Witch admits that such a high price would not normally be required, but the additional magic is needed to heal the forest and as compensation for her collection. Despite the prince attempting to stop her, the princess agrees, and is permanently turned back into her true form.

Some time later, though now a horrible singer, the wolf continues singing to the night sky until the prince (still calling her a princess) appears. Having forgotten who he is, the wolf initially attempts to eat him, but when the prince gives her a bouquet of flowers, she is overwhelmed by nostalgia and sorrow. No longer feeling alone, the two sit next to each other, and the wolf continues singing for the prince.

== Development ==
The idea behind The Liar Princess and the Blind Prince came from a web designer during an internal pitching contest within Nippon Ichi Software. Such contests are held annually at the company and earlier editions resulted in the development of games such as htoL#NiQ: The Firefly Diary and Yomawari: Night Alone. The game was revealed in January 2018 during a live-broadcast video presentation.

In August 2018, NIS America announced they were publishing the game in North America and Europe in 2019, only for the Nintendo Switch and PlayStation 4. NIS America also released a limited physical edition that includes a special book and physical copy of the soundtrack.
