= Z.H.P. Unlosing Ranger VS Darkdeath Evilman =

2010 video game

- North American box art
- Developer: Nippon Ichi Software
- Publishers: JP: Nippon Ichi Software; US: NIS America
- Programmer: Maurice Sibrandi
- Composers: Masaharu Iwata; Manabu Namiki; Kimihiro Abe; Mitsuhiro Kaneda; Noriyuki Kamikura; Azusa Chiba; Yoshimi Kudo
- Platforms: PlayStation Portable; Nintendo Switch; Windows
- Release: March 11, 2010: PlayStation Portable; JPN: March 11, 2010; NA: October 26, 2010; EU: November 3, 2010 Nintendo Switch; JP: March 31, 2022; NA: May 10, 2022; EU: May 13, 2022 Windows; WW: May 10, 2022
- Genre: Tactical role-playing game
- Mode: Single-player

Z.H.P. Unlosing Ranger VS Darkdeath Evilman (Note: Known in Japan as Absolute Hero Modding Project (Japanese: 絶対ヒーロー改造計画, Hepburn: Zettai Hīrō Kaizō Keikaku).) is a tactical role-playing roguelite video game developed and published by Nippon Ichi Software. It was first released for PlayStation Portable on March 11, 2010 in Japan, October 26 in North America, and November 3 in Europe. The game was later released for Nintendo Switch in Japan on March 31, 2022, and as part of the Prinny Presents NIS Classics Volume 2 compilation (alongside Makai Kingdom) worldwide on May 10. On the latter date a standalone Windows version was also released.

The story, heavily inspired by tokusatsu, follows the exploits of the Main Character, an everyman silent protagonist who inherits the title of the superhero Absolute Victory Unlosing Ranger after the previous one, Pirohiko Ichimonji, is killed in a freak car accident. The new Unlosing Ranger must train to become strong enough to defeat Demon General Darkdeath Evilman and rescue Super Baby, the world’s prophesied savior, with the help of the instructor Etranger. Z.H.P. received positive reviews from critics, citing its enjoyable story and innovative gameplay.

== Gameplay ==
Z.H.P. Unlosing Ranger VS Darkdeath Evilman is centered around a single playable character exploring randomly generated, multi-level dungeons similar to those of the Mystery Dungeon games. However, some gameplay mechanics common among Nippon Ichi games are featured in Z.H.P., such as the ability to pick up and throw enemies. Most dungeons, as well as the boss battles at the ends of some dungeons, feature their own unique mechanics and gimmicks, such as cannons that launch the player to a random location on the current floor. Similar to roguelike games, the player is reset to level one upon entering a dungeon. Upon completing a dungeon or being defeated, the player's current level is added to their Total Level count, which affects their base attributes.

Between dungeons, the player is taken to a central hub area called the Home Base. From the home base, the player can access the game's various dungeons, interact with NPCs and sell or store items they collected in the dungeons. The home base can be customized with a variety of facilities, each of which features a unique mechanic that players can use to help them in dungeons. The facilities themselves can be further customized by changing the NPCs in charge of the facilities' functions.

Character customization plays a large part in Z.H.P.'s gameplay. The player can equip items that change the main character's appearance and abilities. The player may also make use of the grid-based Body Modification system to boost their base attributes and give other beneficial effects, such as an increased item-carrying capacity or improve the effects of certain types of equipment.

At the end of each chapter, the player must return to Earth and fight Darkdeath Evilman. These battles are different from the main gameplay in that they are based on turn-based RPG battles. The visual style of these battles changes at various points in the story, starting out reminiscent of the early Dragon Quest games and getting progressively more detailed and modern with every few fights, going from the SNES era of the Final Fantasy series to the most impressive 2D from Super Robot Wars.

== Story ==
=== Setting ===
The game takes place primarily on Earth and a parallel world, Bizarro Earth. The two planets and their residents are linked in a manner such that when someone on Earth experiences something, their Bizarro Earth counterpart experiences a similar event, and vice versa. Floating above Bizarro Earth is a space station called the Hero Training Facility, which is maintained by the World Hero Society. At the Facility, heroes are trained by traveling through dungeons on Bizarro Earth and solving the personal problems of the local residents, thus preventing potential disasters on Earth.

=== Plot ===
In the year 20XX, Super Baby, a baby who is prophesied to save the Earth, is born. The people of Earth pamper it, but its sudden popularity causes it to be kidnapped by the monstrous Demon General Darkdeath Evilman. Darkdeath is then challenged to a fight by the Absolute Victory Unlosing Ranger, a supposedly invincible hero, to decide the fate of Super Baby and the Earth. The game begins with the original Unlosing Ranger, Pirohiko Ichimonji, oversleeping for his climactic battle and running late. As he rushes to confront Darkdeath, he is hit by a passing truck and killed. Before dying, Pirohiko hands his Morphing Belt to a random passerby, the Main Character, forcing him to inherit his title and duties.

The new Ranger then arrives to fight Darkdeath Evilman as the people of the world watch on television, but he is promptly defeated. However, he is saved at the last minute by the World Hero Society and taken to the Hero Training Facility, a space station floating above Bizarro Earth. There he meets Pirohiko's ghost, who has become his guardian spirit, and Etranger, a cynical training instructor. Etranger immediately forces the Main Character to undergo training until he is strong enough to defeat Darkdeath, sending him on missions to help the people on Bizarro Earth and thus resolve personal conflicts of the people of Earth.

Over the course of the story, the Main Character helps people and therefore gains power, although he is still unable to defeat Darkdeath. He also realizes that Etranger is actually Super Baby, psychically projecting herself into Bizarro Earth to help the Main Character. Once he reaches the final dungeon, he discovers that Darkdeath is actually a mecha piloted by a boy genius who was doubtful that real heroes existed. The robot runs amok, but he gains enough power to finally destroy it with the help of Reckless Cop Dangerama, and is able to throw it into outer space before it explodes, saving the world.

=== Characters ===
- The Main Character is the passerby who inherits the Morph Belt from Pirohiko and becomes the new Absolute Victory Unlosing Ranger. He is initially too weak to defeat Darkdeath Evilman so he is forced to train at the Hero Training Facility in order to become a true hero. As a silent protagonist, he does not speak, using the sweatdrop expression as his only means of communication.
- Pirohiko Ichimonji is the previous Absolute Victory Unlosing Ranger. He was initially supposed to fight Darkdeath Evilman but he is killed before he can do so, forcing him to pass on the duties of the Absolute Victory Unlosing Ranger to the protagonist. He later becomes the protagonist’s guardian spirit and teaches him about the virtues of being a true hero. Pirohiko has strong moral values and takes the job of being a hero very seriously, but he is sometimes comedically shown engaging in less-than-heroic behavior, such as stalking girls and making shady deals to maintain his publicity.
- Etranger is the Main Character's training instructor at the Hero Training Facility. She is very cynical and rude and cares more about physical strength than heroic virtues, constantly insulting the Main Character and Pirohiko for being weak.
- Demon General Darkdeath Evilman is a giant demon that kidnaps Super Baby. He serves as the main antagonist.
- Super Baby is the super-powered baby prophesied to save the world. She is kidnapped by Darkdeath Evilman.
- Reckless Cop Dangerama is the Absolute Victory Unlosing Ranger's rival. He protects Super Baby while the Main Character is training on Bizarro Earth. His TV shows keep getting cancelled due to his reckless behavior.
- Narrator

== Reception ==
Reception

Aggregate score
Aggregator	Score
Metacritic	81/100

Z.H.P. received an aggregate score of 81/100 on Metacritic, indicating "generally favorable reviews".

RPGLand.com praised its fresh take on the punishing roguelike genre and gave it a rating of "Great", saying: "It takes a genre notorious for its crazy amount of deaths and makes it a heck of a lot more friendly for the general public. It's certainly not a walk in the park, though, which is great. It's somewhere comfortably between Shiren and Pokémon Mystery Dungeon, and most important of all, it's fun to play". The game was also the runner-up for 2010 PSP Game of the Year in the same site's annual awards.

GamePro reviewed ZHP with 4 out of 5 stars and said: "Z.H.P. is a great introduction to the roguelike genre for those unfamiliar with it, as well as a solid title overall. It still won't appeal to those with a severe dearth of patience -- or those who hate the idea of any sort of permanent penalty for failure -- but if you're looking for a fun (and funny) trip into one of gaming's more underappreciated genres, Z.H.P. is a great time".

=== Legacy ===
The gameplay of Z.H.P. Unlosing Ranger VS Darkdeath Evilman is cited by Nippon Ichi Software President Sohei Niikawa to be very influential in the making of The Guided Fate Paradox. The game is described as a spiritual successor to Z.H.P. Unlosing Ranger VS Darkdeath Evilman by several editors.
