= The Princess Guide =

The Princess Guide may refer to:

- "The Princess Guide" (The Simpsons), episode of The Simpsons
- The Princess Guide (video game), 2018 action role-playing game
