= Poison Control =

2020 action role-playing video game

- Developer: Nippon Ichi Software
- Publisher: Nippon Ichi Software
- Platforms: PlayStation 4, Nintendo Switch
- Release: JP: June 25, 2020; NA: April 13, 2021; EU: April 16, 2021
- Genre: Action role-playing
- Mode: Single-player

Poison Control (少女地獄のドクムス〆, Shōjo Jigoku no Doku Musume) is an action role-playing video game developed and published by Nippon Ichi Software, by the same development team as Penny-Punching Princess and The Princess Guide. It released in Japan on June 25, 2020, and in North America on April 13, 2021, and in Europe on April 16, 2021. It revolves around a gender-selectable human main character who must purify the individual "Belles' Hells" of various girls in order to escape Hell.

== Plot ==
"Belles' Hells" are spiritual realms created by the powerful emotions, or "Delusions", of various girls. However, the Delusions manifest as physical beings, or Klesha, who try to stop the protagonist and steal their body. One such Klesha is Poisonette, who steals the protagonist's body at the start of the game, but makes them work with her to purify the other Klesha and save the girls they belong to.

== Gameplay ==
There are five major areas of the game that the player must beat.

== Reception ==
Reception

Aggregate scores
Aggregator	Score
Metacritic	PS4: 62/100; NS: 61/100
OpenCritic	17% recommend

Review scores
Publication	Score
Nintendo Life	5/10
Nintendo World Report	6/10
RPGamer	3/5

The Nintendo Switch and PlayStation 4 versions of Poison Control both received "mixed or average" reviews from critics, according to the review aggregation website Metacritic. Fellow review aggregator OpenCritic assessed that the game received weak approval, being recommended by 17% of critics.

The game has been compared to a fusion of a third-person shooter and Qix. Areas consisting of poison swamps must be rounded off to "purify" and beat them.
