= Yomawari: Night Alone =

2015 video game

- European cover art
- Developer: Nippon Ichi Software
- Publishers: JP: Nippon Ichi Software; NA/EU: NIS America; AS: Sega (Switch)
- Director: Yu Mizokami
- Producer: Sohei Niikawa
- Designer: Yu Mizokami
- Writers: Kenta Kobayashi; Hirotaka Mieda; Rie Yamagishi
- Composer: Mika Koga
- Platforms: PlayStation Vita; Microsoft Windows; Nintendo Switch
- Release: PlayStation Vita: JP: October 29, 2015; NA: October 25, 2016; EU: October 28, 2016; Microsoft Windows: WW: October 25, 2016; Nintendo Switch: JP: October 25, 2018; EU: October 26, 2018; NA: October 30, 2018
- Genre: Survival horror
- Mode: Single-player

Yomawari: Night Alone (Note: Known in Japan as Yomawari (Japanese: 夜廻)) is a survival horror video game created and developed by Nippon Ichi Software for the PlayStation Vita and Steam. The game was released in Japan on October 29, 2015 and in English in October 2016. Two sequels, Yomawari: Midnight Shadows and Yomawari: Lost in the Dark were released in the following years.

The game was released in October 2018 for the Nintendo Switch, alongside its sequel, as part of Yomawari: The Long Night Collection. (Note: Known as Yomawari: Night Alone & Yomawari: Midnight Shadows for Nintendo Switch (夜廻と深夜廻 for Nintendo Switch, Yomawari to Shin Yomawari for Nintendo Switch) in Japan.)

The third game, Yomawari: Lost in the Dark was announced on May 25, 2022 for the PlayStation 4, Nintendo Switch, and PC.

== Gameplay ==
Players need to explore the town in order to find the protagonist's dog Poro and her elder sister. To do so, a flashlight is needed to illuminate her path and to look for useful items. Anytime you find an item of interest, a question mark (?) will appear to indicate that it can be checked, which will later change to an exclamation point afterwards.

Players can use items such as stones, money and a shovel, depending on their needs. Stones can be used as thrown items or landmarks, the shovel to dig up specific spots such as sand and money as currency to be used in certain places, such as peace offerings. The heartbeat system is used to alert players if a monster is nearby, making the girl move slower and force her actions to be limited. The only way to hide from the monsters is to evade them after observing their patterns or hide in areas like bushes and wait for them to go away with the heartbeat serving as a de facto radar to locate where the monsters are while relying on sounds to make a judgement call to see if its safe to come out of hiding.

In case players need to refresh themselves on what happened the previous nights, they can catch up again by reading the girl's diary.

== Plot ==
A young girl takes her dog named Poro out for a walk. When an accident nearly kills her, she finds her dog missing. Her elder sister agrees to go out and look for Poro. After a few hours of waiting, the girl noticed that her sister is out late.

Going out of her house, she explores the town and notices that it changed. The girl later evades monsters prowling the empty streets while finding clues as to what happened to Poro, her elder sister and who or what was responsible for their disappearance.

== Release ==
Physical copies of the game in North America and Europe came bundled with Hotaru no Nikki. Both games are on the same Vita cartridge, while the Windows collector's edition was released with an additional code to download the game.

Similar to other Nippon Ichi Software games, Sega will be handling publishing duties for the physical copies for Nintendo Switch in Asia outside Japan. The Asia release comes with Traditional Chinese and Japanese language installed and was released on October 25, 2018.

== Reception ==
Reception

Aggregate score
Aggregator	Score
Metacritic	(VITA) 75/100

Review scores
Publication	Score
Destructoid	8/10
Hardcore Gamer	3.5/5
Push Square	7/10

Toshi Nakamura of Kotaku calls it a very emotional game, serving as a "coming of age story of a little girl learning of mortality".

According to NIS, Yomawari sold around 48,000 copies of the game in Japan.

== Sequel ==
On April 25, 2017, Nippon Ichi Software announced a sequel titled Yomawari: Midnight Shadows, which was released on PlayStation 4 and PlayStation Vita in Japan in August 2017. A western release followed in October 2017, adding Microsoft Windows to the selection of platforms.
