= Cladun: This is an RPG =

2010 video game

- Japanese PSP box art
- Developer: System Prisma
- Publishers: JP: Nippon Ichi Software; WW: NIS America
- Platform: PlayStation Portable
- Release: JP: February 18, 2010; NA: September 20, 2010; EU: November 17, 2010
- Genre: Action, role-playing
- Mode: Single-player

ClaDun X2
- Developer: System Prisma
- Publisher: NIS America
- Platforms: PlayStation Portable; Microsoft Windows
- Release: PSP: JP: March 24, 2011; NA: August 30, 2011; EU: September 21, 2011; Windows; August 14, 2012
- Genre: Action, role-playing
- Mode: Single-player

ClaDun Returns: This is Sengoku!
- Developer: Nippon Ichi Software
- Publishers: JP: Nippon Ichi Software; WW: NIS America
- Platforms: PlayStation Vita; PlayStation 4 Microsoft Windows
- Release: JP: May 26, 2016 (Vita); NA: June 6, 2017; EU: June 9, 2017 (PS4, Vita); AU: June 16, 2017 (PS4, Vita)
- Genre: Action, role-playing
- Mode: Single-player

Cladun: This is an RPG, known in Japan as Classic Dungeon: Fuyoku no Masōjin (クラシックダンジョン 〜扶翼の魔装陣〜, Kurasshiku Danjon ~Fuyoku no Masōjin~; lit. "Classic Dungeon: Assistance of the Devil Formation"), is a 2010 action role-playing video game developed by System Prisma and published by Nippon Ichi Software (its parent company) for the PlayStation Portable. The game was released in Japan on February 18, 2010, in North America on September 20, 2010 and in Europe on November 17, 2010.

Cladun: This is an RPG features cooperative and competitive gameplay with up to three other players. Dungeons are randomly generated and the game features customization of not only the main character but also the final boss. Developer Souhei Niikawa compares the game's retro art style to What Did I Do to Deserve This, My Lord?, another Nippon Ichi title. Two sequels for this game were released, ClaDun x2, which was released in 2011 for the PlayStation Portable, and was made available for PC via Steam on August 14, 2012, and ClaDun Returns: This Is Sengoku!, which was released for the PlayStation Vita, PlayStation 4 and Steam in 2016-2017.

== Gameplay ==
=== Custom Characters ===
Custom characters are characters that players create. Players choose a job class, a default format of the character, name, the color and form of the characters boss, and conversation type. After this, the face of the character, the conversation, and other aspects can be edited.

== Plot ==
The story starts with a girl named Pudding and a boy named Soma going to a gate that Pudding believes is a way to go to the magical world "Arcanus Cella". Upon entering, they find themselves in Arcanus Cella. The story progresses as the player finishes levels to unlock characters and places. Each time a floor of a dungeon is finished, more floors are unlocked and sometimes a scene may unlock new characters, or show something about the characters in the game.

== Reception ==
=== Cladun: This is an RPG ===
Cladun: This is an RPG

Aggregate score
Aggregator	Score
Metacritic	78/100

Review scores
Publication	Score
Famitsu	28/40
GameRevolution	B
GameZone	7/10
IGN	8/10
RPGamer	1.5/5
RPGFan	(Patrick) 75% (Neal) 59%
The A.V. Club	B

ClaDun: This is an RPG received "generally favorable reviews" according to the review aggregation website Metacritic. In Japan, Famitsu gave it a score of 28 out of 40.

=== ClaDun x2 ===
Cladun x2

Aggregate score
Aggregator	Score
Metacritic	(PSP) 74/100 (PC) 70/100

Review scores
Publication	Score
Destructoid	6/10
Famitsu	28/40
GameRevolution	B−
GameSpot	6/10
Gamezebo	(PC) 4/5
PlayStation Official Magazine – UK	8/10

ClaDun x2 received "mixed or average reviews" on both platforms according to Metacritic. In Japan, Famitsu gave the PSP version a score of 28 out of 40.

=== ClaDun Returns: This Is Sengoku! ===
ClaDun Returns: This Is Sengoku!

Aggregate score
Aggregator	Score
Metacritic	(PS4) 74/100 (Vita) 62/100 (PC) 60/100

Review scores
Publication	Score
Destructoid	(Vita) 5/10
Famitsu	(Vita) 31/40
Hardcore Gamer	(PS4) 3.5/5
Push Square	(PS4) 6/10
RPGamer	(PS4) 3/5

ClaDun Returns: This Is Sengoku! received "mixed or average reviews" on all platforms according to Metacritic. In Japan, Famitsu gave the PlayStation Vita version a score of 31 out of 40.
