= Labyrinth of Refrain: Coven of Dusk =

2016 video game

- Developer: Nippon Ichi Software
- Publisher: Nippon Ichi Software
- Director: Tatsuya Izumi
- Producer: Souhei Niikawa
- Artist: Takehito Harada
- Composer: Tenpei Sato
- Platforms: PlayStation Vita; PlayStation 4 Microsoft Windows; Nintendo Switch
- Release: PlayStation Vita: JP: June 23, 2016; PlayStation 4: JP: September 28, 2017; NA: September 18, 2018; EU: September 21, 2018; Microsoft Windows: WW: September 18, 2018; Nintendo Switch: NA: September 18, 2018; EU: September 21, 2018; JP: September 27, 2018
- Genres: Role-playing, dungeon crawler
- Mode: Single-player

Labyrinth of Refrain: Coven of Dusk (Note: Known in Japan as Coven and Labyrinth of Refrain (ルフランの地下迷宮と魔女ノ旅団, Refuran no Chika Meikyū to Majo no Ryodan)) is a dungeon crawler role playing video game developed and published by Nippon Ichi Software. It was released in Japan in June 2016 for the PlayStation Vita and in September 2017 for the PlayStation 4. The game was then released internationally on PlayStation 4, Nintendo Switch, and Microsoft Windows in September 2018. It was followed by Labyrinth of Galleria: The Moon Society.

== Gameplay ==
The player walks through the dungeon using a first-person view, which allows the player to navigate it in fixed increments. A dungeon is presented using simple 3D computer graphics. After a random encounter, the party of the player battles a group of monsters, which are presented as 2D sprites, in a turn-based battle.

Because the player character is a book, the witch in the game creates dolls that do the fighting for the player. Dolls are sorted in six classes, so-called Facets: Aster Knights, Shinobushi, Theatrical Stars, Peer Fortresses, Marginal Mazes, and Mad Raptors.

- Aster Knights wield two-handed weapons. They are balanced in defending and attacking.
- Shinobushi specialize in speed and dual-wielding swords.
- Theatrical Stars use special weapons called Spell Bells, allowing them to support other characters in the party while not doing direct damage to opponents.
- Peer Fortresses are the tanks of the game. They have tough armor and can take heavy hits.
- Marginal Mazes use special spells called Donam, which they use for support of other party members. They also perform flame, mud, and fog-based attacks by using special weapons called Eclipse Stands.
- Mad Raptors use weapons called Hyakka Yumi that shoot out flame, mud, and fog-based attacks.

== Plot ==
Set in the town Refrain, Labyrinth of Refrain: Coven of Dusk revolves around a cursed underground labyrinth where people cannot survive very long. Despite that, a certain witch named Madame Dronya comes along with her assistant Luca and volunteers to explore the labyrinth. She is the owner of a legendary book called Tractatus de Monstrum (Youro Rekitei), which role the player fulfills. Together with the witch as their owner, the player challenges the dungeon. Soon, the player finds a strange place called Antechamber, which connects the initial Dungeon to another world. Each of those worlds, presented as Dungeons, are connected to even more different worlds by Antechambers.

While the player travels through different Dungeons, they see fragments of Madame Dronya's past and learns that they are supposed to find three special keys that will open the gate to the realm of the dead, where the deceased can potentially be revived. During her adventure, Dronya sometimes gets into situations which end fatal for her. But somehow, time turns back to moments before these things happen and the situation gets altered in the process, allowing Dronya to survive them. Madame Dronya is eager to revive one person that she lost in the past. But Baba Yaga, who was a teacher of Magic for Dronya and other girls, wants the keys for herself. Dronya is able to trick Baba Yaga and lure her into a trap, killing her in the process.

She manages to find all three keys and enters a realm under the well of Refrain, but when she tries to make her wish come true, the spirit of Baba Yaga returns, revealing herself as Calamity Witch Furia, who wrote the Tractatus de Monstrum and planned to possess a world-destroying entity called Velkuvrana to become the immortal ruler and destroyer of everything. It is also revealed that Dronya was a puppet that contains the spirit of Velnya, Dronya's former self. She died trying to save Luca in the past and the guilt ridden Luca went to Baba Yaga who told her to put Dronya's Spirit into a puppet. Dronya had no memories of this and sends Luca and the Tractatus de Monstrum to the surface of Refrain, where she has to fight a monstrous fusion of Baba Yaga and Velkuvrana to save their world. Baba Velkuvrana, not having fully matured, gets defeated by Luca and her puppet soldiers.

Luca wants to use the keys to revive Velnya, but they have to pass a trial to fulfill the wish - moving up a long staircase to the surface without looking back for even a single time. Before they reach the surface, Dronya learns that the memories she made as Dronya - her life together with Luca - would fade after her resurrection. She uses her power to command Luca to move upstairs without looking back and turns around to leave the world without forgetting about all the happy times she spent with Luca. She vanishes while wishing to be reunited with her beloved Isara (Luca's deceased mother and Velnya's lover) in the afterlife.

== Development ==
Labyrinth of Refrain: Coven of Dusk was first teased by Nippon Ichi Software through their annual Summer greeting card in July 2015 as Project Refrain. A full reveal followed a month later in Dengeki PlayStation. Originally scheduled for a Japanese release on January 28, 2016, the game got delayed to March 17 and later June 23 of that year. In February 2018, NIS America announced that the game will be localised into English and French and released in North America and Europe in the Fall of 2018. The international release adds versions for Nintendo Switch and Microsoft Windows. While the game was previously available in Japan for both the PlayStation Vita and the PlayStation 4, NIS America revealed they will only release the version for the latter platform in western territories.

== Reception ==
Reception

Aggregate score
Aggregator	Score
Metacritic	PS4: 75/100 (Note: Score based on 9 reviews); NS: 75/100 (Note: Score based on 8 reviews)

Review scores
Publication	Score
Famitsu	32/40
Game Informer	8.5/10
Hardcore Gamer	3/5
Nintendo Life	7/10
Nintendo World Report	8.5/10
Push Square	6/10
RPGFan	79/100

Labyrinth of Refrain: Coven of Dusk received "generally favorable reviews" according to review aggregator website Metacritic. The Japanese magazine Famitsu gave Coven and Labyrinth of Refrain a score of 32 out of 40 upon its Japanese release. According to Media Create, the game was the fifth best-selling game of the week in Japan, selling 17,573 physical copies. The game left chart after five weeks, when 42,519 copies were sold. In February 2017, Nippon Ichi Software CEO and the game's producer Souhei Niikawa said in an interview with 4Gamer.net that over 70,000 copies of the game were sold.
