= Nippon Ichi Software =

Japanese video game developer and publisher

Nippon Ichi Software, Inc.

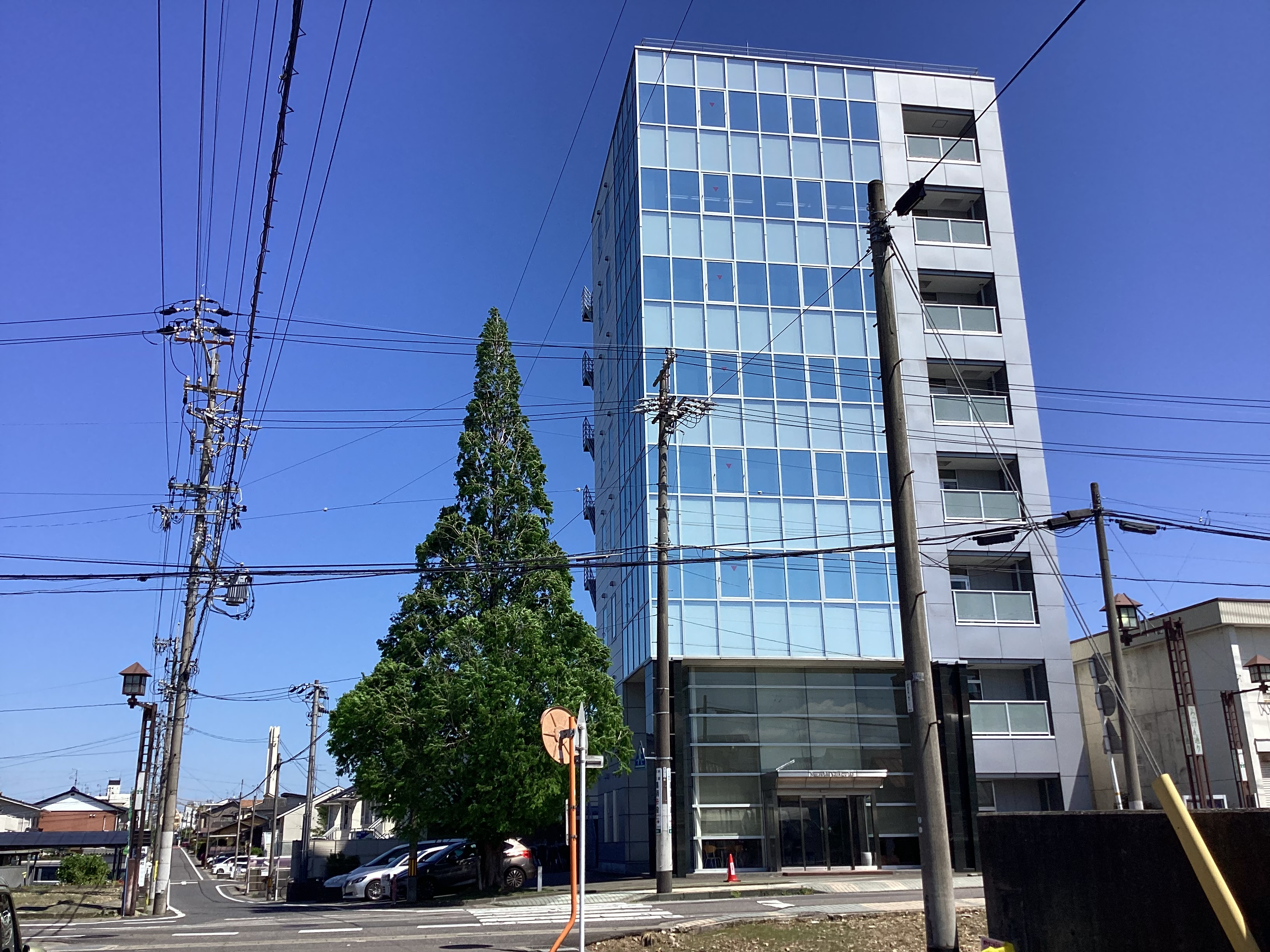
- Headquarters in Kakamigahara, Gifu
- Native name: 株式会社日本一ソフトウェア
- Romanized name: Kabushiki gaisha Nippon Ichi Sofutowea
- Type: Public (K.K)
- Traded as: TYO: 3851
- Industry: Video games
- Founded: September 1991; 35 years ago; (as Prism Kikaku); July 12, 1993; 33 years ago; (as Nippon Ichi Software)
- Headquarters: Kakamigahara, Gifu, Japan
- Key people: Kenzo Saruhashi (president)
- Products: Disgaea series; Marl Kingdom series
- Revenue: ▼¥3.409 billion (2017)
- Total assets: ▲¥3.883 billion (2017)
- Number of employees: 193 (2025)
- Subsidiaries: NIS America; NIS Vietnam; SystemSoft Beta; Studio ToOeuf; Nagoya Graphic Studio
- Website: nippon1.co.jp

Nippon Ichi Software, Inc. (株式会社日本一ソフトウェア, Nippon Ichi Sofutowea; known as Prism Kikaku Ltd. from July 1993 to July 1995) is a Japanese video game developer and publisher. The company was founded in 1991 and has developed several role-playing video games, most notably the Disgaea and Marl Kingdom series. Its mascot is the penguin-like Disgaea character Prinny.

NIS America, a localization and global publishing branch of the company, was founded in 2003. It originally focused solely on the North American market until being expanded to include Europe and other regions in 2007 and has also published anime.

== History ==
Nippon Ichi Software was founded in September 1991 in Gifu Prefecture, Japan, as an entertainment software company. It was relocated and reincorporated on July 12, 1993. The company has made several acquisitions, mergers, and forming new subsidiaries. In the early 2010s, the company formed Nippon Ichi Software Asia Pte. Ltd and Nippon Ichi Software Vietnam Co., Ltd. In 2016, NIS merged with System Prisma Corporation and acquired developer FOG Inc. In 2012, the company was awarded the Guinness World Record for being the company that released the most strategy RPGs. The company assisted Hamster Corporation on their release of the Arcade Archives series in 2014, eventually dropping out as the series gained financial success.

The company has developed a number of traditional role-playing video games. Many characters from previous games make their way into later games as secret characters, even though their respective games may not be directly connected. Their flagship franchise, Disgaea, takes place in the same universe.

== Games ==
Games by Nippon Ichi Software
Title	Platform	Release date				Developer(s)	Ref.
Title	Platform	Japan	North America	Europe	Australia	Developer(s)	Ref.
Pieces (Note: Published by Hori Electric in Japan, and Atlus USA in North America.)	Super NES	July 22, 1994	December 1994	Unreleased	Unreleased	Prism Kikaku	
Jigsaw World	PlayStation	February 3, 1995	Unreleased	Unreleased	Unreleased	Nippon Ichi Software	
The Oni Taiji: Mezase! Nidaime Momotarō	PlayStation	October 13, 1995	Unreleased	Unreleased	Unreleased	Nippon Ichi Software	
Hanafuda Graffiti: Koikoi Monogatari	PlayStation	May 10, 1996	Unreleased	Unreleased	Unreleased	Nippon Ichi Software	
Jigsaw Island: Japan Graffiti	PlayStation	September 13, 1996	Unreleased	Unreleased	Unreleased	Nippon Ichi Software	
Sōryu: Logical Mahjong	PlayStation	December 20, 1996	Unreleased	Unreleased	Unreleased	Nippon Ichi Software	
Angel Blade: Neo Tokyo Guardians	PlayStation	July 3, 1997	Unreleased	Unreleased	Unreleased	Nippon Ichi Software	
Doki Doki Shutter Chance: Koi no Puzzle o Kumitatete	PlayStation	October 23, 1997	Unreleased	Unreleased	Unreleased	Nippon Ichi Software	
SatelliTV	PlayStation	January 8, 1998	Unreleased	Unreleased	Unreleased	Nippon Ichi Software	
Cooking Fighter Hao	PlayStation	May 21, 1998	Unreleased	Unreleased	Unreleased	Nippon Ichi Software	
Rhapsody: A Musical Adventure (Note: Published by Atlus USA in North America.)	PlayStation	December 17, 1998	July 30, 2000	Unreleased	Unreleased	Nippon Ichi Software	
Logic Mahjong Sōryu	PlayStation	May 4, 1999	Unreleased	Unreleased	Unreleased	Nippon Ichi Software	
Rhapsody II: Ballad of the Little Princess	PlayStation	November 25, 1999	Unreleased	Unreleased	Unreleased	Nippon Ichi Software	
Rhapsody III: Memories of Marl Kingdom	PlayStation 2	December 21, 2000	Unreleased	Unreleased	Unreleased	Nippon Ichi Software	
Marl de Jigsaw	PlayStation 2	November 15, 2001	Unreleased	Unreleased	Unreleased	Nippon Ichi Software	
La Pucelle: Tactics (Note: Published by Mastiff in North America, and Koei in Europe and Australia.)	PlayStation 2	January 31, 2002	May 4, 2004	April 1, 2005	April 15, 2005	Nippon Ichi Software	
Jigsaw Madness (Note: Published by XS Games.)	PlayStation	Unreleased	December 1, 2002	December 1, 2002	Unreleased	Nippon Ichi Software	
Disgaea: Hour of Darkness (Note: Published by Atlus USA in North America, and Koei in Europe.)	PlayStation 2	January 30, 2003	August 27, 2003	May 28, 2004	August 30, 2004	Nippon Ichi Software	
Meth Ethereal: Seirei no Sumu Shima	Feature phones	April 1, 2003	Unreleased	Unreleased	Unreleased	Nippon Ichi Software	
Marl Jong!!	PlayStation	April 23, 2003	Unreleased	Unreleased	Unreleased	Nippon Ichi Software	
Phantom Brave (Note: Published by Koei in Europe.)	PlayStation 2	January 22, 2004	August 31, 2004	February 4, 2005	Unreleased	Nippon Ichi Software	
Mugen Keitai Disgaea	Feature phones	April 25, 2004	Unreleased	Unreleased	Unreleased	Nippon Ichi Software	
Hayarigami: Keishichō Kaii Jiken File	PlayStation 2	August 5, 2004	Unreleased	Unreleased	Unreleased	Nippon Ichi Software	
Marl Ōkoku no Ningyō Hime i	Feature phones	January 24, 2005	Unreleased	Unreleased	Unreleased	Nippon Ichi Software	
Makai Kingdom: Chronicles of the Sacred Tome	PlayStation 2	March 17, 2005	July 26, 2005	October 25, 2005	Unreleased	Nippon Ichi Software	
Eien no Aseria: The Spirit of Eternity Sword	PlayStation 2	May 12, 2005	Unreleased	Unreleased	Unreleased	Xuse	
Hayarigami Revenge: Keishichō Kaii Jiken File	PlayStation 2	July 14, 2005	Unreleased	Unreleased	Unreleased	Nippon Ichi Software	
Tristia of the Deep-Blue Sea	PlayStation 2	August 11, 2005	Unreleased	Unreleased	Unreleased	Kogado Studio, Kumasan Team	
Rasetsu Alternative	PlayStation 2	October 13, 2005	Unreleased	Unreleased	Unreleased	Kogado Studio	
Hayarigami Portable: Keishichō Kaii Jiken File	PlayStation Portable	December 15, 2005	Unreleased	Unreleased	Unreleased	Nippon Ichi Software	
Duologue	Feature phones	February 20, 2006	Unreleased	Unreleased	Unreleased	Nippon Ichi Software	
Disgaea 2: Cursed Memories	PlayStation 2	February 23, 2006	August 29, 2006	November 3, 2006	November 23, 2006	Nippon Ichi Software	
Disgaea: Afternoon of Darkness (Note: Published by Koei in Europe and Australia.)	PlayStation Portable	November 30, 2006	October 30, 2007	December 14, 2007	December 20, 2007	Nippon Ichi Software	
Little Princess i	Feature phones	December 18, 2006	Unreleased	Unreleased	Unreleased	Nippon Ichi Software	
Soul Nomad & the World Eaters	PlayStation 2	February 15, 2007	September 25, 2007	June 27, 2008	June 26, 2008	Nippon Ichi Software	
Neosphere of the Deep-Blue Sky	PlayStation 2	February 22, 2007	Unreleased	Unreleased	Unreleased	Kogado Studio	
Amagōshi no Yakata	PlayStation 2	March 8, 2007	Unreleased	Unreleased	Unreleased	FOG Inc.	
GrimGrimoire	PlayStation 2	April 12, 2007	June 26, 2007	September 28, 2007	September 28, 2007	Nippon Ichi Software, Vanillaware	
Hayarigami Mobile: Keishichō Kaii Jiken File	Feature phones	July 1, 2007	Unreleased	Unreleased	Unreleased	Nippon Ichi Software	
Dragoneer's Aria	PlayStation Portable	August 23, 2007	August 21, 2007	February 15, 2008	February 2, 2008	Hit Maker	
Hayarigami 2: Keishichō Kaii Jiken File	PlayStation 2	November 15, 2007	Unreleased	Unreleased	Unreleased	Nippon Ichi Software	
Kuon no Kizuna Mobile	Feature phones	January 28, 2008	Unreleased	Unreleased	Unreleased	Nippon Ichi Software	
Disgaea 3: Absence of Justice	PlayStation 3	January 31, 2008	August 26, 2008	February 20, 2009	March 5, 2009	Nippon Ichi Software	
Tori no Hoshi: Aerial Planet	PlayStation 2	February 28, 2008	Unreleased	Unreleased	Unreleased	NK-System	
Naraku no Shiro: Ichiyanagi Nagomu, Nidome no Junan	PlayStation 2	March 6, 2008	Unreleased	Unreleased	Unreleased	FOG Inc.	
Jigsaw World: Daigekitō! Jig-Battle Heroes	Nintendo DS	June 26, 2008	Unreleased	Unreleased	Unreleased	Nippon Ichi Software	
Disgaea DS (Note: Published by Square Enix in Australia.)	Nintendo DS	June 26, 2008	September 23, 2008	April 3, 2009	April 2, 2009	Nippon Ichi Software	
Makai Gakuen Disgaea	Feature phones	June 30, 2008	Unreleased	Unreleased	Unreleased	Nippon Ichi Software	
Dragonvein	Feature phones	June 30, 2008	Unreleased	Unreleased	Unreleased	Nippon Ichi Software	
Infinite Loop: Kojjō ga Miseta Yume	PlayStation Portable	July 24, 2008	Unreleased	Unreleased	Unreleased	Nippon Ichi Software	
Hayarigami 2 Portable: Keishichō Kaii Jiken File	PlayStation Portable	August 7, 2008	Unreleased	Unreleased	Unreleased	Nippon Ichi Software	
Rhapsody: A Musical Adventure (Note: Published by Ubisoft in Australia.)	Nintendo DS	August 7, 2008	September 23, 2008	March 27, 2009	March 26, 2009	Nippon Ichi Software	
Prinny: Can I Really Be the Hero?	PlayStation Portable	November 20, 2008	February 17, 2009	June 26, 2009	July 16, 2009	Nippon Ichi Software	
The Conveni DS: Otona no Keiei Ryoku Training	Nintendo DS	November 27, 2008	Unreleased	Unreleased	Unreleased	Hamster Corporation	
Phantom Brave: We Meet Again	Wii	March 12, 2009	August 14, 2009	Unreleased	Unreleased	System Prisma	
Musō Tōrō	PlayStation Portable	March 19, 2009	Unreleased	Unreleased	Unreleased	FOG Inc.	
Disgaea 2: Dark Hero Days	PlayStation Portable	March 26, 2009	September 8, 2009	February 5, 2010	February 18, 2010	Nippon Ichi Software	
Let's Full Power Hitchhike!!!!!!!!!	Wii	March 31, 2009	Unreleased	Unreleased	Unreleased	DropWave	
Deep Diver	Feature phones	April 6, 2009	Unreleased	Unreleased	Unreleased	Nippon Ichi Software	
Missing Parts Mobile: Naranai Orugōru	Feature phones	April 6, 2009	Unreleased	Unreleased	Unreleased	Nippon Ichi Software	
A Witch's Tale	Nintendo DS	May 28, 2009	October 6, 2009	Unreleased	Unreleased	Hit Maker	
Hayarigami DS: Toshi Densetsu Kaii Jiken	Nintendo DS	June 11, 2009	Unreleased	Unreleased	Unreleased	Nippon Ichi Software	
Maruhan Pachinko & Pachi-Slot Hisshō Guide Kanshū: The Pachinko Hall	Nintendo DS	June 25, 2009	Unreleased	Unreleased	Unreleased	Hamster Corporation	
Hayarigami 2 DS: Toshi Densetsu Kaii Jiken	Nintendo DS	July 9, 2009	Unreleased	Unreleased	Unreleased	Nippon Ichi Software	
Hayarigami 3: Keishichō Kaii Jiken File	PlayStation Portable	August 6, 2009	Unreleased	Unreleased	Unreleased	Nippon Ichi Software	
Amagōshi no Yakata Portable: Ichiyanagi Nagomu, Saisho no Junan	PlayStation Portable	September 17, 2009	Unreleased	Unreleased	Unreleased	FOG Inc.	
Trinity Universe (Note: Published by Idea Factory in Japan.)	PlayStation 3	October 1, 2009	June 29, 2010	June 25, 2010	Unreleased	Gust, Idea Factory, Nippon Ichi Software	
Antiphona no Seikahime: Tenshi no Score Op.A	PlayStation Portable	October 22, 2009	Unreleased	Unreleased	Unreleased	O-Two Inc.	
Disgaea Infinite	PlayStation Portable	November 1, 2009	June 8, 2010	November 17, 2010	Unreleased	Nippon Ichi Software	
La Pucelle Ragnarok	PlayStation Portable	November 26, 2009	Unreleased	Unreleased	Unreleased	Nippon Ichi Software	
Naraku no Shiro Portable: Ichiyanagi Nagomu, Nidome no Junan	PlayStation Portable	December 17, 2009	Unreleased	Unreleased	Unreleased	FOG Inc.	
Last Rebellion	PlayStation 3	January 28, 2010	February 23, 2010	March 26, 2010	Unreleased	Hit Maker, Nippon Ichi Software	
Cladun: This is an RPG	PlayStation Portable	February 18, 2010	September 20, 2010	November 17, 2010	Unreleased	System Prisma	
Kōri no Haka: Ichiyanagi Nagomu, Sandome no Junan	PlayStation Portable	February 25, 2010	Unreleased	Unreleased	Unreleased	FOG Inc.	
Z.H.P. Unlosing Ranger VS Darkdeath Evilman	PlayStation Portable	March 11, 2010	October 26, 2010	November 3, 2010	Unreleased	Nippon Ichi Software	
Prinny 2: Dawn of Operation Panties, Dood!	PlayStation Portable	March 25, 2010	January 10, 2011	December 15, 2010	Unreleased	Nippon Ichi Software	
Uta no Prince-sama (Note: Published by Broccoli.)	PlayStation Portable	June 24, 2010	Unreleased	Unreleased	Unreleased	Nippon Ichi Software	
Second Novel: Kanojo no Natsu, Jūgo-bun no Kioku	PlayStation Portable	July 29, 2010	Unreleased	Unreleased	Unreleased	Text	
Gendai Ibun Hayarigami: Dai Rei-wa	iOS	August 7, 2010	Unreleased	Unreleased	Unreleased	Nippon Ichi Software	
Gendai Ibun Hayarigami: Dai Ichi-wa	iOS	August 19, 2010	Unreleased	Unreleased	Unreleased	Nippon Ichi Software	
Gendai Ibun Hayarigami: Dai Ni-wa	iOS	August 19, 2010	Unreleased	Unreleased	Unreleased	Nippon Ichi Software	
Blue Roses: Yōsei to Aoi Hitomi no Senshitachi	PlayStation Portable	September 16, 2010	Unreleased	Unreleased	Unreleased	ApolloSoft	
Gendai Ibun Hayarigami: Dai Saishū Banashi	iOS	September 17, 2010	Unreleased	Unreleased	Unreleased	Nippon Ichi Software	
Phantom Brave: The Hermuda Triangle	PlayStation Portable	October 28, 2010	August 3, 2011	September 3, 2011	Unreleased	Nippon Ichi Software	
Criminal Girls	PlayStation Portable	November 18, 2010	Unreleased	Unreleased	Unreleased	Imageepoch	
Uta no Prince-sama: Amazing Aria	PlayStation Portable	December 23, 2010	Unreleased	Unreleased	Unreleased	Nippon Ichi Software	
Uta no Prince-sama: Sweet Serenade	PlayStation Portable	February 10, 2011	Unreleased	Unreleased	Unreleased	Nippon Ichi Software	
Disgaea 4: A Promise Unforgotten	PlayStation 3	February 24, 2011	September 6, 2011	November 4, 2011	November 24, 2011	Nippon Ichi Software	
Cladun X2	PlayStation Portable	March 24, 2011	August 30, 2011	September 21, 2011	Unreleased	System Prisma	
Disgaea: Netherworld Unbound	Android	May 16, 2011	Unreleased	Unreleased	Unreleased	GMO Internet	
Bikkuriman Kanjuku Haoh: Sanmi Dōran Sensōki	Nintendo 3DS	July 21, 2011	Unreleased	Unreleased	Unreleased	Nippon Ichi Software	
Uta no Prince-sama Repeat	PlayStation Portable	August 11, 2011	Unreleased	Unreleased	Unreleased	Nippon Ichi Software	
Phantom Kingdom Portable	PlayStation Portable	October 6, 2011	Unreleased	Unreleased	Unreleased	Nippon Ichi Software	
Uta no Prince-sama Music	PlayStation Portable	November 24, 2011	Unreleased	Unreleased	Unreleased	Nippon Ichi Software	
Disgaea 3: Absence of Detention	PlayStation Vita	December 17, 2011	April 17, 2012	April 20, 2012	April 26, 2012	Nippon Ichi Software	
Web Phantom Brave	Web browser	March 14, 2012	Unreleased	Unreleased	Unreleased	Gamania	
Legasista	PlayStation 3	March 15, 2012	August 21, 2012	August 22, 2012	Unreleased	System Prisma	
Uta no Prince-sama Debut	PlayStation Portable	May 24, 2012	Unreleased	Unreleased	Unreleased	Nippon Ichi Software	
Special Report Division	PlayStation Vita	August 23, 2012	Unreleased	Unreleased	Unreleased	Nippon Ichi Software	
Disgaea Makai Collection	Android	September 24, 2012	Unreleased	Unreleased	Unreleased	Dione Entertainment	
Disgaea Makai Collection	Feature phones	September 24, 2012	Unreleased	Unreleased	Unreleased	Dione Entertainment	
Missing Parts: The Tantei Stories Complete	PlayStation Portable	November 29, 2012	Unreleased	Unreleased	Unreleased	FOG Inc.	
The Guided Fate Paradox	PlayStation 3	January 24, 2013	November 5, 2013	October 25, 2013	October 25, 2013	Nippon Ichi Software	
Uta no Prince-sama All Star	PlayStation Portable	March 7, 2013	Unreleased	Unreleased	Unreleased	Nippon Ichi Software	
Disgaea D2: A Brighter Darkness	PlayStation 3	March 20, 2013	October 8, 2013	September 27, 2013	October 3, 2013	Nippon Ichi Software	
Disgaea Legion Battle	Android	April 25, 2013	Unreleased	Unreleased	Unreleased	Nippon Ichi Software	
Z/X Zillions of Enemy X: Zekkai no Crusade	PlayStation 3	May 23, 2013	Unreleased	Unreleased	Unreleased	Nippon Ichi Software	
The Witch and the Hundred Knight	PlayStation 3	July 25, 2013	March 25, 2014	March 21, 2014	March 27, 2014	Nippon Ichi Software	
Uta no Prince-sama Music 2	PlayStation Portable	September 5, 2013	Unreleased	Unreleased	Unreleased	Nippon Ichi Software	
Battle Princess of Arcadias	PlayStation 3	September 26, 2013	June 17, 2014	June 18, 2014	Unreleased	Nippon Ichi Software	
Kamigami no Asobi: Ludere deorum	PlayStation Portable	October 24, 2013	Unreleased	Unreleased	Unreleased	Nippon Ichi Software	
Criminal Girls: Invite Only	PlayStation Vita	November 28, 2013	February 3, 2015	February 6, 2015	February 6, 2015	Imageepoch	
Criminal Girls: Invite Only	Windows	January 11, 2017	January 11, 2017	January 11, 2017	January 11, 2017	Imageepoch	
Disgaea 4: A Promise Revisited	PlayStation Vita	January 30, 2014	August 12, 2014	August 29, 2014	September 11, 2014	Nippon Ichi Software	
If You Thought It Was Harem Paradise, It Was Yandere Hell	PlayStation 3	April 24, 2014	Unreleased	Unreleased	Unreleased	Nippon Ichi Software	
Hotaru no Nikki: The Firefly Diary	PlayStation Vita	June 19, 2014	February 24, 2015	March 4, 2015	March 4, 2015	Nippon Ichi Software	
Hotaru no Nikki: The Firefly Diary	Windows	May 18, 2016	May 18, 2016	May 18, 2016	May 18, 2016	Nippon Ichi Software	
Shin Hayarigami	PlayStation 3	August 7, 2014	Unreleased	Unreleased	Unreleased	Nippon Ichi Software	
Shin Hayarigami	PlayStation Vita	August 7, 2014	Unreleased	Unreleased	Unreleased	Nippon Ichi Software	
The Awakened Fate Ultimatum	PlayStation 3	September 25, 2014	March 17, 2015	March 20, 2015	March 19, 2015	Nippon Ichi Software	
Great Edo Blacksmith	PlayStation Vita	November 27, 2014	Unreleased	Unreleased	Unreleased	Nippon Ichi Software	
Criminal Girls: Busse	Web browser	January 6, 2015	Unreleased	Unreleased	Unreleased	Nippon Ichi Software	
Fuuraiki 3	PlayStation Vita	February 19, 2015	Unreleased	Unreleased	Unreleased	FOG Inc.	
Uta no Prince-sama All Star After Secret	PlayStation Portable	February 26, 2015	Unreleased	Unreleased	Unreleased	Nippon Ichi Software	
Disgaea 5: Alliance of Vengeance	PlayStation 4	March 26, 2015	October 6, 2015	October 16, 2015	October 16, 2015	Nippon Ichi Software	
The Witch and the Hundred Knight Revival Edition	PlayStation 4	September 25, 2015	March 1, 2016	March 4, 2016	March 3, 2016	Nippon Ichi Software	
Yomawari: Night Alone	PlayStation Vita	October 29, 2015	October 25, 2016	October 28, 2016	October 28, 2016	Nippon Ichi Software	
Yomawari: Night Alone	Windows	October 25, 2016	October 25, 2016	October 25, 2016	October 25, 2016	Nippon Ichi Software	
Criminal Girls 2: Party Favors	PlayStation Vita	November 26, 2015	October 11, 2016	September 23, 2016	Unreleased	Nippon Ichi Software	
Hero Must Die	PlayStation Vita	February 15, 2016	Unreleased	Unreleased	Unreleased	Pyramid	
Disgaea PC	Windows	February 24, 2016	February 24, 2016	February 24, 2016	February 24, 2016	Nippon Ichi Software	
Kamigami no Asobi InFinite	PlayStation Portable	April 21, 2016	Unreleased	Unreleased	Unreleased	Nippon Ichi Software	
Kamigami no Asobi InFinite	PlayStation Vita	April 21, 2016	Unreleased	Unreleased	Unreleased	Nippon Ichi Software	
A Rose in the Twilight	PlayStation Vita	April 26, 2016	April 11, 2017	April 14, 2017	April 14, 2017	Nippon Ichi Software	
A Rose in the Twilight	Windows	April 11, 2017	April 11, 2017	April 11, 2017	April 11, 2017	Nippon Ichi Software	
Cladun Returns: This is Sengoku!	PlayStation Vita	May 26, 2016	June 6, 2017	June 9, 2017	June 16, 2017	Nippon Ichi Software	
Cladun Returns: This is Sengoku!	Windows	June 6, 2017	June 6, 2017	June 6, 2017	June 6, 2017	Nippon Ichi Software	
Cladun Returns: This is Sengoku!	PlayStation 4	June 6, 2017	June 6, 2017	June 9, 2017	June 16, 2017	Nippon Ichi Software	
Labyrinth of Refrain: Coven of Dusk	PlayStation Vita	June 23, 2016	Unreleased	Unreleased	Unreleased	Nippon Ichi Software	
Labyrinth of Refrain: Coven of Dusk	PlayStation 4	September 28, 2017	September 18, 2018	September 21, 2018	September 21, 2018	Nippon Ichi Software	
Labyrinth of Refrain: Coven of Dusk	Windows	September 18, 2018	September 18, 2018	September 18, 2018	September 18, 2018	Nippon Ichi Software	
Labyrinth of Refrain: Coven of Dusk	Nintendo Switch	September 27, 2018	September 18, 2018	September 21, 2018	September 21, 2018	Nippon Ichi Software	
Shin Hayarigami 2	PlayStation 3	July 7, 2016	Unreleased	Unreleased	Unreleased	Nippon Ichi Software	
Shin Hayarigami 2	PlayStation 4	July 7, 2016	Unreleased	Unreleased	Unreleased	Nippon Ichi Software	
Shin Hayarigami 2	PlayStation Vita	July 7, 2016	Unreleased	Unreleased	Unreleased	Nippon Ichi Software	
Phantom Brave PC	Windows	July 25, 2016	July 25, 2016	July 25, 2016	July 25, 2016	Nippon Ichi Software	
The Longest Five Minutes	PlayStation Vita	July 28, 2016	February 13, 2018	February 16, 2018	February 23, 2018	Nippon Ichi Software, Syupro-DX	
The Longest Five Minutes	Windows	February 13, 2018	February 13, 2018	February 13, 2018	February 13, 2018	Nippon Ichi Software, Syupro-DX	
The Longest Five Minutes	Nintendo Switch	February 13, 2018	February 13, 2018	February 16, 2018	February 23, 2018	Nippon Ichi Software, Syupro-DX	
Penny-Punching Princess	PlayStation Vita	November 24, 2016	April 3, 2018	March 30, 2018	April 13, 2018	Nippon Ichi Software	
Penny-Punching Princess	Nintendo Switch	March 30, 2018	April 3, 2018	March 30, 2018	April 13, 2018	Nippon Ichi Software	
Disgaea 2 PC	Windows	January 30, 2017	January 30, 2017	January 30, 2017	January 30, 2017	Nippon Ichi Software	
Disgaea 2 PC	macOS	January 30, 2017	January 30, 2017	January 30, 2017	January 30, 2017	Nippon Ichi Software	
Disgaea 2 PC	Linux	January 30, 2017	January 30, 2017	January 30, 2017	January 30, 2017	Nippon Ichi Software	
The Witch and the Hundred Knight 2	PlayStation 4	February 23, 2017	March 27, 2018	March 30, 2018	April 13, 2018	Nippon Ichi Software	
Disgaea 5 Complete	Nintendo Switch	March 3, 2017	May 23, 2017	May 26, 2017	May 26, 2017	Nippon Ichi Software	
Disgaea 5 Complete	Windows	October 22, 2018	October 22, 2018	October 22, 2018	October 22, 2018	Nippon Ichi Software	
The Silver Case	PlayStation 4	March 15, 2018	April 18, 2017	April 21, 2017	April 21, 2017	Grasshopper Manufacture	
Exile Election	PlayStation 4	April 27, 2017	Unreleased	Unreleased	Unreleased	Regista	
Exile Election	PlayStation Vita	April 27, 2017	Unreleased	Unreleased	Unreleased	Regista	
Hakoniwa Company Works	PlayStation 4	July 13, 2017	Unreleased	Unreleased	Unreleased	Nippon Ichi Software	
Yomawari: Midnight Shadows	PlayStation 4	August 24, 2017	October 24, 2017	October 27, 2017	November 3, 2017	Nippon Ichi Software	
Yomawari: Midnight Shadows	PlayStation Vita	August 24, 2017	October 24, 2017	October 27, 2017	November 3, 2017	Nippon Ichi Software	
Yomawari: Midnight Shadows	Windows	October 24, 2017	October 24, 2017	October 24, 2017	October 24, 2017	Nippon Ichi Software	
Iwaihime: Matsuri	PlayStation 4	September 7, 2017	Unreleased	Unreleased	Unreleased	Nippon Ichi Software, Ryukishi07	
Iwaihime: Matsuri	PlayStation Vita	September 7, 2017	Unreleased	Unreleased	Unreleased	Nippon Ichi Software, Ryukishi07	
Makai Wars	Android	February 15, 2018	Unreleased	Unreleased	Unreleased	Nippon Ichi Software, Clover Lab	
Makai Wars	iOS	February 16, 2018	Unreleased	Unreleased	Unreleased	Nippon Ichi Software, Clover Lab	
The Princess Guide	Nintendo Switch	March 8, 2018	March 26, 2019	March 29, 2019	April 5, 2019	Nippon Ichi Software	
The Princess Guide	PlayStation 4	March 8, 2018	March 26, 2019	March 29, 2019	April 5, 2019	Nippon Ichi Software	
The Princess Guide	PlayStation Vita	March 8, 2018	Unreleased	Unreleased	Unreleased	Nippon Ichi Software	
The 25th Ward: The Silver Case	Windows	March 13, 2018	March 13, 2018	March 13, 2018	March 13, 2018	Grasshopper Manufacture	
The 25th Ward: The Silver Case	OS X	March 13, 2018	March 13, 2018	March 13, 2018	March 13, 2018	Grasshopper Manufacture	
The 25th Ward: The Silver Case	Linux	March 13, 2018	March 13, 2018	March 13, 2018	March 13, 2018	Grasshopper Manufacture	
The 25th Ward: The Silver Case	PlayStation 4	March 15, 2018	March 13, 2018	March 13, 2018	March 13, 2018	Grasshopper Manufacture	
Logic Mahjong Souryu: Yonin Uchi / Sannin Uchi	Nintendo Switch eShop	April 12, 2018	Unreleased	Unreleased	Unreleased	Nippon Ichi Software	
The Liar Princess and the Blind Prince	Nintendo Switch	May 31, 2018	February 12, 2019	February 12, 2019	February 12, 2019	Nippon Ichi Software	
The Liar Princess and the Blind Prince	PlayStation 4	May 31, 2018	February 12, 2019	February 12, 2019	February 12, 2019	Nippon Ichi Software	
The Liar Princess and the Blind Prince	PlayStation Vita	May 31, 2018	Unreleased	Unreleased	Unreleased	Nippon Ichi Software	
Closed Nightmare	Nintendo Switch	July 19, 2018	Unreleased	Unreleased	Unreleased	Nippon Ichi Software	
Closed Nightmare	PlayStation 4	July 19, 2018	Unreleased	Unreleased	Unreleased	Nippon Ichi Software	
Disgaea 1 Complete	Nintendo Switch	July 26, 2018	October 9, 2018	October 12, 2018	October 19, 2018	Nippon Ichi Software	
Disgaea 1 Complete	PlayStation 4	July 26, 2018	October 9, 2018	October 12, 2018	October 19, 2018	Nippon Ichi Software	
Yomawari: The Long Night Collection	Nintendo Switch	October 25, 2018	October 30, 2018	October 26, 2018	October 26, 2018	Nippon Ichi Software	
Lapis x Labyrinth (Note: Published by Sega)	Nintendo Switch	November 29, 2018	May 28, 2019	May 31, 2019	June 7, 2019	Nippon Ichi Software	
Lapis x Labyrinth	PlayStation 4	November 29, 2018	May 28, 2019	May 31, 2019	June 7, 2019	Nippon Ichi Software	
Destiny Connect	Nintendo Switch	March 14, 2019	October 22, 2019	October 25, 2019	November 1, 2019	Nippon Ichi Software	
Destiny Connect	PlayStation 4	March 14, 2019	October 22, 2019	October 25, 2019	November 1, 2019	Nippon Ichi Software	
Murderer Detective: Jack the Ripper	Nintendo Switch	April 25, 2019	Unreleased	Unreleased	Unreleased	Nippon Ichi Software	
Murderer Detective: Jack the Ripper	PlayStation 4	April 25, 2019	Unreleased	Unreleased	Unreleased	Nippon Ichi Software	
Void Terrarium	Nintendo Switch	January 23, 2020	July 14, 2020	July 10, 2020	July 10, 2020	Nippon Ichi Software	
Void Terrarium	PlayStation 4	January 23, 2020	July 14, 2020	July 10, 2020	July 10, 2020	Nippon Ichi Software	
Void Terrarium	PlayStation 5 (Note: Released as Void Terrarium++ for PlayStation 5 in May 2021. Void Terrarium++ comes bundled with the "Toriko's Care Package" DLC that is available as a separate purchase for the Nintendo Switch and PlayStation 4 versions of the game.)	January 23, 2020	July 14, 2020	July 10, 2020	July 10, 2020	Nippon Ichi Software	
Bokuhime Project	Nintendo Switch	April 23, 2020	Unreleased	Unreleased	Unreleased	Wizard Soft	
Bokuhime Project	PlayStation 4	April 23, 2020	Unreleased	Unreleased	Unreleased	Wizard Soft	
Poison Control	Nintendo Switch	June 25, 2020	April 13, 2021	April 16, 2021	April 16, 2021	Nippon Ichi Software	
Poison Control	PlayStation 4	June 25, 2020	April 13, 2021	April 16, 2021	April 16, 2021	Nippon Ichi Software	
Yoru, Tomosu	Nintendo Switch	July 30, 2020	Unreleased	Unreleased	Unreleased	Nippon Ichi Software	
Yoru, Tomosu	PlayStation 4	July 30, 2020	Unreleased	Unreleased	Unreleased	Nippon Ichi Software	
Mad Rat Dead	Nintendo Switch	October 29, 2020	October 30, 2020	October 30, 2020	November 6, 2020	Nippon Ichi Software	
Mad Rat Dead	PlayStation 4	October 29, 2020	October 30, 2020	October 30, 2020	November 6, 2020	Nippon Ichi Software	
Labyrinth of Galleria: The Moon Society	PlayStation Vita	November 26, 2020	February 14, 2023	February 14, 2023	February 14, 2023	Nippon Ichi Software	
Labyrinth of Galleria: The Moon Society	PlayStation 4	November 26, 2020	February 14, 2023	February 14, 2023	February 14, 2023	Nippon Ichi Software	
Labyrinth of Galleria: The Moon Society	PlayStation 5	February 14, 2023	February 14, 2023	February 14, 2023	February 14, 2023	Nippon Ichi Software	
Labyrinth of Galleria: The Moon Society	Windows	February 14, 2023	February 14, 2023	February 14, 2023	February 14, 2023	Nippon Ichi Software	
Disgaea 6: Defiance of Destiny	Nintendo Switch	January 28, 2021	June 29, 2021	June 29, 2021	July 9, 2021	Nippon Ichi Software	
Disgaea 6: Defiance of Destiny	PlayStation 4	January 28, 2021	June 28, 2022	June 28, 2022	June 28, 2022	Nippon Ichi Software	
Disgaea 6: Defiance of Destiny	Windows	June 26, 2022	June 26, 2022	June 26, 2022	June 26, 2022	Nippon Ichi Software	
Process of Elimination	Nintendo Switch	May 27, 2021	April 11, 2023	April 14, 2023	April 14, 2023	Nippon Ichi Software	
Process of Elimination	PlayStation 4	May 27, 2021	April 11, 2023	April 14, 2023	April 14, 2023	Nippon Ichi Software	
The Cruel King and the Great Hero	Nintendo Switch	June 24, 2021	March 15, 2022	March 11, 2022	March 11, 2022	Nippon Ichi Software	
The Cruel King and the Great Hero	PlayStation 4	June 24, 2021	March 15, 2022	March 11, 2022	March 11, 2022	Nippon Ichi Software	
Shin Hayarigami 3	Nintendo Switch	July 29, 2021	Unreleased	Unreleased	Unreleased	Nippon Ichi Software	
Shin Hayarigami 3	PlayStation 4	July 29, 2021	Unreleased	Unreleased	Unreleased	Nippon Ichi Software	
Asatsugutori	Nintendo Switch	November 25, 2021	Unreleased	Unreleased	Unreleased	Nippon Ichi Software	
Asatsugutori	PlayStation 4	November 25, 2021	Unreleased	Unreleased	Unreleased	Nippon Ichi Software	
Monster Menu: The Scavenger's Cookbook	Nintendo Switch	January 27, 2022	May 23, 2023	May 26, 2023	June 2, 2023	Nippon Ichi Software	
Monster Menu: The Scavenger's Cookbook	PlayStation 4	January 27, 2022	May 23, 2023	May 26, 2023	June 2, 2023	Nippon Ichi Software	
Yomawari: Lost in the Dark	PlayStation 4	April 21, 2022	October 25, 2022	October 28, 2022	October 28, 2022	Nippon Ichi Software	
Yomawari: Lost in the Dark	Nintendo Switch	April 21, 2022	October 25, 2022	October 28, 2022	October 28, 2022	Nippon Ichi Software	
Yomawari: Lost in the Dark	Windows	October 25, 2022	October 25, 2022	October 25, 2022	October 25, 2022	Nippon Ichi Software	
Void Terrarium 2	PlayStation 4	June 30, 2022	February 28, 2023	March 3, 2023	March 3, 2023	Nippon Ichi Software	
Void Terrarium 2	Nintendo Switch	June 30, 2022	February 28, 2023	March 3, 2023	March 3, 2023	Nippon Ichi Software	
Disgaea 7: Vows of the Virtueless	Nintendo Switch	January 26, 2023	October 3, 2023	October 6, 2023	October 13, 2023	Nippon Ichi Software	
Disgaea 7: Vows of the Virtueless	PlayStation 4	January 26, 2023	October 3, 2023	October 6, 2023	October 13, 2023	Nippon Ichi Software	
Disgaea 7: Vows of the Virtueless	PlayStation 5	January 26, 2023	October 3, 2023	October 6, 2023	October 13, 2023	Nippon Ichi Software	
Xicatrice	Nintendo Switch	June 29, 2023	Unreleased	Unreleased	Unreleased	Nippon Ichi Software	
Xicatrice	PlayStation 4	June 29, 2023	Unreleased	Unreleased	Unreleased	Nippon Ichi Software	
Xicatrice	PlayStation 5	June 29, 2023	Unreleased	Unreleased	Unreleased	Nippon Ichi Software	
Bar Stella Abyss	Nintendo Switch	February 29, 2024	Unreleased	Unreleased	Unreleased	Nippon Ichi Software	
Bar Stella Abyss	PlayStation 4	February 29, 2024	Unreleased	Unreleased	Unreleased	Nippon Ichi Software	
Bar Stella Abyss	PlayStation 5	February 29, 2024	Unreleased	Unreleased	Unreleased	Nippon Ichi Software	
Phantom Brave: The Lost Hero	Nintendo Switch	January 30, 2025	January 30, 2025	January 30, 2025	January 30, 2025	Nippon Ichi Software	
Phantom Brave: The Lost Hero	PlayStation 4	January 30, 2025	January 30, 2025	January 30, 2025	January 30, 2025	Nippon Ichi Software	
Phantom Brave: The Lost Hero	PlayStation 5	January 30, 2025	January 30, 2025	January 30, 2025	January 30, 2025	Nippon Ichi Software	
Phantom Brave: The Lost Hero	Windows	April 24, 2025	April 24, 2025	April 24, 2025	April 24, 2025	Nippon Ichi Software	
Disgaea Mayhem	Nintendo Switch	January 29, 2026	July 23, 2026	July 23, 2026	July 23, 2026	Nippon Ichi Software	
Disgaea Mayhem	Nintendo Switch 2	January 29, 2026	July 23, 2026	July 23, 2026	July 23, 2026	Nippon Ichi Software	
Disgaea Mayhem	PlayStation 5	January 29, 2026	July 23, 2026	July 23, 2026	July 23, 2026	Nippon Ichi Software	
Disgaea Mayhem	Windows	July 23, 2026	July 23, 2026	July 23, 2026	July 23, 2026	Nippon Ichi Software	
The Grimm Reapress and the Drearytale Monster	Nintendo Switch	April 30, 2026	May 13, 2027	May 13, 2027	May 13, 2027	Nippon Ichi Software	
The Grimm Reapress and the Drearytale Monster	Nintendo Switch 2	April 30, 2026	May 13, 2027	May 13, 2027	May 13, 2027	Nippon Ichi Software	
The Grimm Reapress and the Drearytale Monster	PlayStation 5	April 30, 2026	May 13, 2027	May 13, 2027	May 13, 2027	Nippon Ichi Software	
The Grimm Reapress and the Drearytale Monster	Windows	May 13, 2027	May 13, 2027	May 13, 2027	May 13, 2027	Nippon Ichi Software	
Village in the Shade	Nintendo Switch	July 29, 2026	October 27, 2026	October 27, 2026	October 27, 2026	Nippon Ichi Software	
Village in the Shade	Nintendo Switch 2	July 29, 2026	October 27, 2026	October 27, 2026	October 27, 2026	Nippon Ichi Software	
Village in the Shade	PlayStation 5	July 29, 2026	October 27, 2026	October 27, 2026	October 27, 2026	Nippon Ichi Software	
Village in the Shade	Windows	July 29, 2026	October 27, 2026	October 27, 2026	October 27, 2026	Nippon Ichi Software	
GOBBLE	Nintendo Switch	September 24, 2026	2027	2027	2027	Nippon Ichi Software	
GOBBLE	Nintendo Switch 2	September 24, 2026	2027	2027	2027	Nippon Ichi Software	
GOBBLE	PlayStation 5	September 24, 2026	2027	2027	2027	Nippon Ichi Software	
GOBBLE	Windows	September 24, 2026	2027	2027	2027	Nippon Ichi Software	
Prinny Party: Going Overboard!	Nintendo Switch	November 12, 2026	November 11, 2026	November 11, 2026	November 11, 2026	Nippon Ichi Software	
Prinny Party: Going Overboard!	Nintendo Switch 2	November 12, 2026	November 11, 2026	November 11, 2026	November 11, 2026	Nippon Ichi Software	
Prinny Party: Going Overboard!	PlayStation 5	November 12, 2026	November 11, 2026	November 11, 2026	November 11, 2026	Nippon Ichi Software	
Prinny Party: Going Overboard!	Windows	November 12, 2026	November 11, 2026	November 11, 2026	November 11, 2026	Nippon Ichi Software	

=== Nippon Ichi Indie Spirits ===
Nippon Ichi Indie Spirits, a label under which the company localises non-Japanese indie games for the Japanese market, was formed on December 28, 2016. The label's first games, Nidhogg, Back to Bed, and Emily Wants to Play, were released in February 2017. All games that are published through this program are only released digitally.

Title	System	Release date	Developer(s)	Ref.
Nidhogg	PlayStation 4	February 9, 2017	Messhof	
Nidhogg	PlayStation Vita	February 9, 2017	Messhof	
Back to Bed	PlayStation 3	February 9, 2017	Bedtime Digital Games	
Back to Bed	PlayStation 4	February 9, 2017	Bedtime Digital Games	
Back to Bed	PlayStation Vita	February 9, 2017	Bedtime Digital Games	
Emily Wants to Play	PlayStation 4	February 9, 2017	Shawn Hitchcock	
The Sexy Brutale	PlayStation 4	June 8, 2017	Cavalier Game Studios, Tequila Works	
So Many Me	PlayStation 4	July 20, 2017	Extend Studio	
Nidhogg 2	PlayStation 4	October 6, 2017	Messhof	
Unepic	PlayStation 4	December 14, 2017	Francisco Téllez de Meneses	
The Sexy Brutale	Nintendo Switch	December 21, 2017	Cavalier Game Studios, Tequila Works	
Yonder: The Cloud Catcher Chronicles	PlayStation 4	February 22, 2018	Prideful Sloth	
Yonder: The Cloud Catcher Chronicles	Nintendo Switch	July 5, 2018	Prideful Sloth	
Rainbow Skies	PlayStation 4	December 20, 2018	Eastasiasoft	
Rainbow Skies	PlayStation Vita	December 20, 2018	Eastasiasoft	

== NIS America ==
NIS America, a localization and global publishing branch of Nippon Ichi Software, was founded on December 24, 2003. Based in Santa Ana, California, it originally focused solely on the North American market until being expanded to include Europe and other regions in 2007. The branch was the result of the company's wish to focus on international publication of their works in the United States, given the increased popularity of their games outside of Japan. Prior to 2003, NIS games were released in English by contracted publishers. Some of the company's more well-known releases include entries in the Atelier, Ys, and Trails series, among others.

=== Games ===
Games published by NIS America
Title	System	Release date	Developer(s)	NA	EU	Ref.
Atelier Iris: Eternal Mana (Note: Published by Koei in Europe, and THQ in Australia.)	PlayStation 2	June 28, 2005	Gust	Yes	Yes	
Generation of Chaos (Note: Published by Midas Interactive Entertainment in Europe and Australia.)	PlayStation Portable	February 28, 2006	Idea Factory	Yes	Yes	
Atelier Iris 2: The Azoth of Destiny	PlayStation 2	April 25, 2006	Gust	Yes	Yes	
Blade Dancer: Lineage of Light (Note: Published by Ignition Entertainment in Europe.)	PlayStation Portable	July 18, 2006	Japan Studio, Hit Maker	Yes	Yes	
Spectral Souls: Resurrection of the Ethereal Empires (Note: Published by Ghostlight in Europe.)	PlayStation Portable	September 26, 2006	Idea Factory	Yes		
Ar Tonelico: Melody of Elemia (Note: Published by 505 Games in Europe.)	PlayStation 2	February 7, 2007	Gust	Yes		
Aedis Eclipse: Generation of Chaos	PlayStation Portable	May 24, 2007	Idea Factory	Yes		
Atelier Iris 3: Grand Phantasm	PlayStation 2	May 29, 2007	Gust	Yes	Yes	
Mana Khemia: Alchemists of Al-Revis	PlayStation 2	March 31, 2008	Gust	Yes	Yes	
Ar Tonelico 2: Melody of Metafalica	PlayStation 2	January 20, 2009	Gust	Yes	Yes	
Mana Khemia: Student Alliance	PlayStation Portable	March 10, 2009	Gust	Yes	Yes	
Puchi Puchi Virus	Nintendo DS	May 19, 2009	KeysFactory	Yes		
Cross Edge (Note: Published by Koei in Australia.)	PlayStation 3	May 26, 2009	Idea Factory	Yes	Yes	
What Did I Do to Deserve This, My Lord?	PlayStation Portable	July 16, 2009	Acquire	Yes	Yes	
Mana Khemia 2: Fall of Alchemy	PlayStation 2	August 25, 2009	Gust	Yes		
Atelier Annie: Alchemists of Sera Island	Nintendo DS	October 27, 2009	Gust	Yes		
Sakura Wars: So Long, My Love	PlayStation 2	March 30, 2010	Sega, Idea Factory	Yes	Yes	
Sakura Wars: So Long, My Love	Wii	March 30, 2010	Sega, Idea Factory	Yes	Yes	
What Did I Do to Deserve This, My Lord? 2	PlayStation Portable	May 4, 2010	Acquire	Yes	Yes	
Viral Survival	Wii	May 24, 2010	Peakvox	Yes	Yes	
Atelier Rorona: The Alchemist of Arland	PlayStation 3	September 28, 2010	Gust	Yes	Yes	
Hyperdimension Neptunia (Note: Published by Tecmo Koei in Europe.)	PlayStation 3	February 15, 2011	Compile Heart, Idea Factory	Yes	Yes	
Ar Tonelico Qoga: Knell of Ar Ciel	PlayStation 3	March 15, 2011	Gust, Banpresto	Yes	Yes	
Bleach: Soul Resurrección	PlayStation 3	August 2, 2011	Japan Studio, Racjin	Yes	Yes	
Atelier Totori: The Adventurer of Arland	PlayStation 3	September 27, 2011	Gust	Yes	Yes	
Cave Story 3D	Nintendo 3DS	November 8, 2011	Nicalis	Yes	Yes	
Hyperdimension Neptunia Mk2	PlayStation 3	February 28, 2012	Idea Factory, Compile Heart	Yes	Yes	
Atelier Meruru: The Apprentice of Arland	PlayStation 3	May 29, 2012	Gust	Yes	Yes	
Cladun X2	Windows	August 14, 2012	System Prisma	Yes	Yes	
Way of the Samurai 4 (Note: Published by Xseed Games in North America, and Spike in Australia.)	PlayStation 3	October 5, 2012	Acquire		Yes	
Mugen Souls	PlayStation 3	October 16, 2012	Compile Heart	Yes	Yes	
Clan of Champions	Windows	October 30, 2012	Acquire	Yes	Yes	
Clan of Champions	PlayStation 3	October 30, 2012	Acquire	Yes	Yes	
Generation of Chaos: Pandora's Reflection	PlayStation Portable	February 19, 2013	Sting Entertainment, Idea Factory	Yes	Yes	
Persona 4 Golden	PlayStation Vita	February 22, 2013	Atlus		Yes	
Hyperdimension Neptunia Victory	PlayStation 3	March 21, 2013	Compile Heart, Idea Factory	Yes	Yes	
Black Rock Shooter: The Game	PlayStation Portable	April 23, 2013	Imageepoch	Yes	Yes	
Time and Eternity	PlayStation 3	July 16, 2013	Imageepoch	Yes	Yes	
Etrian Odyssey IV: Legends of the Titan	Nintendo 3DS	August 30, 2013	Atlus		Yes	
Shin Megami Tensei: Devil Summoner: Soul Hackers	Nintendo 3DS	September 20, 2013	Atlus		Yes	
Dragon's Crown	PlayStation 3	October 11, 2013	Vanillaware		Yes	
Dragon's Crown	PlayStation Vita	October 11, 2013	Vanillaware		Yes	
Danganronpa: Trigger Happy Havoc	PlayStation Vita	February 14, 2014	Spike Chunsoft	Yes	Yes	
Ys: Memories of Celceta (Note: Published by Xseed Games in North America.)	PlayStation Vita	February 21, 2014	Nihon Falcom		Yes	
Demon Gaze	PlayStation Vita	April 22, 2014	Experience Inc.	Yes	Yes	
Etrian Odyssey Untold: The Millennium Girl	Nintendo 3DS	May 2, 2014	Atlus		Yes	
Mugen Souls Z	PlayStation 3	May 20, 2014	Compile Heart	Yes	Yes	
Hyperdimension Neptunia: Producing Perfection	PlayStation Vita	June 3, 2014	Tamsoft	Yes	Yes	
Danganronpa 2: Goodbye Despair	PlayStation Vita	September 2, 2014	Spike Chunsoft	Yes	Yes	
Fairy Fencer F	PlayStation 3	September 16, 2014	Compile Heart	Yes	Yes	
Natural Doctrine	PlayStation 3	September 30, 2014	Kadokawa Games	Yes	Yes	
Natural Doctrine	PlayStation 4	September 30, 2014	Kadokawa Games	Yes	Yes	
Natural Doctrine	PlayStation Vita	September 30, 2014	Kadokawa Games	Yes	Yes	
Akiba's Trip: Undead & Undressed	PlayStation 3	October 10, 2014	Acquire		Yes	
Akiba's Trip: Undead & Undressed	PlayStation 4	October 10, 2014	Acquire		Yes	
Akiba's Trip: Undead & Undressed	PlayStation Vita	October 10, 2014	Acquire		Yes	
Tears to Tiara II: Heir of the Overlord	PlayStation 3	November 11, 2014	Aquaplus		Yes	
Arcana Heart 3: Love Max!!!!! (Note: Published by Aksys Games in North America.)	PlayStation 3	September 21, 2014	Examu		Yes	
Arcana Heart 3: Love Max!!!!!	PlayStation Vita	September 21, 2014	Examu		Yes	
Persona Q: Shadow of the Labyrinth	Nintendo 3DS	September 28, 2014	Atlus		Yes	
Under Night In-Birth Exe:Late	PlayStation 3	February 27, 2015	Ecole Software, French Bread		Yes	
Tokyo Twilight Ghost Hunters	PlayStation 3	March 13, 2015	Now Production, Toybox Inc.		Yes	
Tokyo Twilight Ghost Hunters	PlayStation Vita	March 13, 2015	Now Production, Toybox Inc.		Yes	
Operation Abyss: New Tokyo Legacy	PlayStation Vita	June 9, 2015	Experience Inc.	Yes	Yes	
Lost Dimension	PlayStation 3	August 28, 2015	Lancarse		Yes	
Lost Dimension	PlayStation Vita	August 28, 2015	Lancarse		Yes	
Onechanbara Z2: Chaos	PlayStation 4	August 28, 2015	Tamsoft		Yes	
Danganronpa Another Episode: Ultra Despair Girls	PlayStation Vita	September 1, 2015	Spike Chunsoft	Yes	Yes	
Etrian Mystery Dungeon	Nintendo 3DS	September 11, 2015	Atlus, Spike Chunsoft		Yes	
Dungeon Travelers 2: The Royal Library & the Monster Seal	PlayStation Vita	October 16, 2015	Sting Entertainment		Yes	
Devil Survivor 2: Record Breaker	Nintendo 3DS	October 30, 2015	Atlus		Yes	
Persona 4: Dancing All Night	PlayStation Vita	November 6, 2015	Atlus		Yes	
Rodea the Sky Soldier	Nintendo 3DS	November 10, 2015	Prope, Kadokawa Games	Yes	Yes	
Rodea the Sky Soldier	Wii	November 10, 2015	Prope, Kadokawa Games	Yes	Yes	
Rodea the Sky Soldier	Wii U	November 10, 2015	Prope, Kadokawa Games	Yes	Yes	
The Legend of Heroes: Trails of Cold Steel	PlayStation 3	January 29, 2016	Nihon Falcom		Yes	
The Legend of Heroes: Trails of Cold Steel	PlayStation Vita	January 29, 2016	Nihon Falcom		Yes	
The Legend of Legacy	Nintendo 3DS	February 5, 2016	FuRyu, Grezzo, Cattle Call		Yes	
Etrian Odyssey 2 Untold: The Fafnir Knight	Nintendo 3DS	February 12, 2016	Atlus		Yes	
Stella Glow	Nintendo 3DS	March 11, 2016	Imageepoch		Yes	
République (Note: Published by GungHo Online Entertainment in North America.)	PlayStation 4	March 25, 2016	Camouflaj, Logan Games, Darkwind Media		Yes	
Stranger of Sword City	PlayStation Vita	April 26, 2016	Experience Inc.	Yes	Yes	
Grand Kingdom	PlayStation 4	June 17, 2016	Monochrome Corporation	Yes	Yes	
Grand Kingdom	PlayStation Vita	June 17, 2016	Monochrome Corporation	Yes	Yes	
Odin Sphere: Leifthrasir	PlayStation 3	June 24, 2016	Atlus		Yes	
Odin Sphere: Leifthrasir	PlayStation 4	June 24, 2016	Atlus		Yes	
Odin Sphere: Leifthrasir	PlayStation Vita	June 24, 2016	Atlus		Yes	
Touhou Genso Rondo: Bullet Ballet	PlayStation 4	September 6, 2016	Cubetype	Yes	Yes	
Psycho-Pass: Mandatory Happiness	Windows	September 13, 2016	5pb., Unico Inc.	Yes	Yes	
Psycho-Pass: Mandatory Happiness	PlayStation 4	September 13, 2016	5pb., Unico Inc.	Yes	Yes	
Psycho-Pass: Mandatory Happiness	PlayStation Vita	September 13, 2016	5pb., Unico Inc.	Yes	Yes	
Tokyo Twilight Ghost Hunters Daybreak: Special Gigs	PlayStation 3	October 21, 2016	Now Production, Toybox Inc.		Yes	
Tokyo Twilight Ghost Hunters Daybreak: Special Gigs	PlayStation 4	October 21, 2016	Now Production, Toybox Inc.		Yes	
Tokyo Twilight Ghost Hunters Daybreak: Special Gigs	PlayStation Vita	October 21, 2016	Now Production, Toybox Inc.		Yes	
The Legend of Heroes: Trails of Cold Steel II	PlayStation 3	November 11, 2016	Nihon Falcom		Yes	
The Legend of Heroes: Trails of Cold Steel II	PlayStation Vita	November 11, 2016	Nihon Falcom		Yes	
Danganronpa 1–2 Reload	PlayStation 4	March 14, 2017	Spike Chunsoft	Yes	Yes	
Touhou Genso Wanderer	PlayStation 4	March 21, 2017	Aqua Style	Yes	Yes	
Touhou Genso Wanderer	PlayStation Vita	March 21, 2017	Aqua Style	Yes	Yes	
Touhou Double Focus	PlayStation 4	March 21, 2017	Aqua Style	Yes	Yes	
Touhou Double Focus	PlayStation Vita	March 21, 2017	Aqua Style	Yes	Yes	
Birthdays the Beginning	Windows	May 9, 2017	Toybox Inc.	Yes	Yes	
Birthdays the Beginning	PlayStation 4	May 9, 2017	Toybox Inc.	Yes	Yes	
Operation Babel: New Tokyo Legacy	Windows	May 16, 2017	Experience Inc.	Yes	Yes	
Operation Babel: New Tokyo Legacy	PlayStation Vita	May 16, 2017	Experience Inc.	Yes	Yes	
God Wars: Future Past	PlayStation 4	June 16, 2017	Kadokawa Games	Yes	Yes	
God Wars: Future Past	PlayStation Vita	June 16, 2017	Kadokawa Games	Yes	Yes	
Danganronpa Another Episode: Ultra Despair Girls	PlayStation 4	June 23, 2017	Spike Chunsoft	Yes	Yes	
RPG Maker Fes	Nintendo 3DS	June 23, 2017	Kadokawa Games	Yes	Yes	
Ys VIII: Lacrimosa of Dana	PlayStation 4	September 12, 2017	Nihon Falcom	Yes	Yes	
Ys VIII: Lacrimosa of Dana	PlayStation Vita	September 12, 2017	Nihon Falcom	Yes	Yes	
Danganronpa V3: Killing Harmony	PlayStation 4	September 26, 2017	Spike Chunsoft	Yes	Yes	
Danganronpa V3: Killing Harmony	PlayStation Vita	September 26, 2017	Spike Chunsoft	Yes	Yes	
Culdcept Revolt	Nintendo 3DS	October 3, 2017	OmiyaSoft	Yes	Yes	
Touhou Kobuto V: Burst Battle	Nintendo Switch	October 10, 2017	Cubetype	Yes	Yes	
Touhou Kobuto V: Burst Battle	PlayStation 4	October 10, 2017	Cubetype	Yes	Yes	
Touhou Kobuto V: Burst Battle	PlayStation Vita	October 10, 2017	Cubetype	Yes	Yes	
Demon Gaze II	PlayStation 4	November 14, 2017	Experience Inc.	Yes	Yes	
Demon Gaze II	PlayStation Vita	November 14, 2017	Experience Inc.	Yes	Yes	
Tokyo Tattoo Girls	Windows	November 14, 2017	Sushi Typhoon Games	Yes	Yes	
Tokyo Tattoo Girls	PlayStation Vita	November 14, 2017	Sushi Typhoon Games	Yes	Yes	
Ys VIII: Lacrimosa of Dana	Windows	April 16, 2018	Nihon Falcom	Yes	Yes	
Assault Spy	Windows	May 7, 2018	Wazen	Yes	Yes	
Fallen Legion: Rise To Glory	Nintendo Switch	May 29, 2018	YummyYummyTummy	Yes	Yes	
Happy Birthdays	Nintendo Switch	June 5, 2018	Toybox Inc.	Yes	Yes	
The Lost Child	Nintendo Switch	June 19, 2018	Crim, Kadokawa Games	Yes	Yes	
The Lost Child	PlayStation 4	June 19, 2018	Crim, Kadokawa Games	Yes	Yes	
The Lost Child	PlayStation Vita	June 19, 2018	Crim, Kadokawa Games	Yes	Yes	
Touhou Genso Wanderer: Reloaded	Nintendo Switch	July 17, 2018	Aqua Style	Yes	Yes	
Touhou Genso Wanderer: Reloaded	PlayStation 4	July 17, 2018	Aqua Style	Yes	Yes	
God Wars: The Complete Legend	Nintendo Switch	August 31, 2018	Kadokawa Games	Yes	Yes	
SNK Heroines: Tag Team Frenzy	Nintendo Switch	September 7, 2018	SNK	Yes	Yes	
SNK Heroines: Tag Team Frenzy	PlayStation 4	September 7, 2018	SNK	Yes	Yes	
Metal Max Xeno	PlayStation 4	September 25, 2018	Kadokawa Games	Yes	Yes	
SNK 40th Anniversary Collection	Nintendo Switch	November 13, 2018	SNK	Yes	Yes	
killer7	Windows	November 15, 2018	Grasshopper Manufacture	Yes	Yes	
RPG Maker MV	Nintendo Switch	February 26, 2019	Kadokawa Games	Yes	Yes	
RPG Maker MV	PlayStation 4	February 26, 2019	Kadokawa Games	Yes	Yes	
RPG Maker MV	Xbox One	February 26, 2019	Kadokawa Games	Yes	Yes	
The Caligula Effect: Overdose	Windows	March 12, 2019	FuRyu, Historia	Yes	Yes	
The Caligula Effect: Overdose	Nintendo Switch	March 12, 2019	FuRyu, Historia	Yes	Yes	
The Caligula Effect: Overdose	PlayStation 4	March 12, 2019	FuRyu, Historia	Yes	Yes	
The Legend of Heroes: Trails of Cold Steel III	PlayStation 4	October 22, 2019	Nihon Falcom	Yes	Yes	
The Legend of Heroes: Trails of Cold Steel III	Windows	March 23, 2020	Nihon Falcom	Yes	Yes	
The Legend of Heroes: Trails of Cold Steel III	Nintendo Switch	June 20, 2020	Nihon Falcom	Yes	Yes	
Disaster Report 4: Summer Memories	PlayStation 4	April 7, 2020	Granzella	Yes	Yes	
Disaster Report 4: Summer Memories	Windows	April 7, 2020	Granzella	Yes	Yes	
Disaster Report 4: Summer Memories	Nintendo Switch	April 7, 2020	Granzella	Yes	Yes	
Utawarerumono: Prelude to the Fallen	PlayStation 4	May 26, 2020	Sting Entertainment	Yes	Yes	
Utawarerumono: Prelude to the Fallen	PlayStation Vita	May 26, 2020	Sting Entertainment	Yes	Yes	
R-Type Final 2	PlayStation 4	April 30, 2021	Granzella	Yes	Yes	
R-Type Final 2	Xbox One	April 30, 2021	Granzella	Yes	Yes	
R-Type Final 2	Xbox Series X/S	April 30, 2021	Granzella	Yes	Yes	
R-Type Final 2	Windows	April 30, 2021	Granzella	Yes	Yes	
R-Type Final 2	Nintendo Switch	April 30, 2021	Granzella	Yes	Yes	
The Legend of Heroes: Trails of Cold Steel IV	PlayStation 4	October 27, 2020	Nihon Falcom	Yes	Yes	
The Legend of Heroes: Trails of Cold Steel IV	Windows	April 9, 2021	Nihon Falcom	Yes	Yes	
The Legend of Heroes: Trails of Cold Steel IV	Nintendo Switch	April 9, 2021	Nihon Falcom	Yes	Yes	
World's End Club	Nintendo Switch	May 28, 2021	Too Kyo Games	Yes	Yes	
The Caligula Effect 2	Nintendo Switch	October 19, 2021	FuRyu, Historia	Yes	Yes	
The Caligula Effect 2	PlayStation 4	October 19, 2021	FuRyu, Historia	Yes	Yes	
Monark	Nintendo Switch	February 22, 2022	FuRyu	Yes	Yes	
Monark	PlayStation 4	February 22, 2022	FuRyu	Yes	Yes	
Monark	PlayStation 5	February 22, 2022	FuRyu	Yes	Yes	
Monark	Windows	February 22, 2022	FuRyu	Yes	Yes	
Crystar	Nintendo Switch	March 29, 2022	FuRyu	Yes	Yes	
Yurukill: The Calumniation Games	Nintendo Switch	June 7, 2022	G.rev	Yes	Yes	
Yurukill: The Calumniation Games	PlayStation 4	June 7, 2022	G.rev	Yes	Yes	
Yurukill: The Calumniation Games	PlayStation 5	June 7, 2022	G.rev	Yes	Yes	
Yurukill: The Calumniation Games	Windows	June 7, 2022	G.rev	Yes	Yes	
Fallen Legion: Rise to Glory / Fallen Legion Revenants	Windows	August 23, 2022	YummyYummyTummy, Inc.	Yes	Yes	
Fallen Legion: Rise to Glory / Fallen Legion Revenants	PlayStation 5	August 23, 2022	YummyYummyTummy, Inc.	Yes	Yes	
Fallen Legion: Rise to Glory / Fallen Legion Revenants	Xbox Series X and Series S	August 23, 2022	YummyYummyTummy, Inc.	Yes	Yes	
Fallen Legion: Rise to Glory / Fallen Legion Revenants	Xbox One	August 23, 2022	YummyYummyTummy, Inc.	Yes	Yes	
The Legend of Heroes: Trails from Zero	Windows	September 27, 2022	Nihon Falcom	Yes	Yes	
The Legend of Heroes: Trails from Zero	Nintendo Switch	September 27, 2022	Nihon Falcom	Yes	Yes	
The Legend of Heroes: Trails from Zero	PlayStation 4	September 27, 2022	Nihon Falcom	Yes	Yes	
Kamiwaza: Way of the Thief	Windows	November 11, 2022	Acquire	Yes	Yes	
Kamiwaza: Way of the Thief	Nintendo Switch	November 11, 2022	Acquire	Yes	Yes	
Kamiwaza: Way of the Thief	PlayStation 4	November 11, 2022	Acquire	Yes	Yes	
Ys VIII: Lacrimosa of Dana	PlayStation 5	November 15, 2022	Nihon Falcom	Yes	Yes	
Raiden IV x MIKADO remix	PlayStation 5	January 31, 2023	MOSS	Yes	Yes	
Raiden IV x MIKADO remix	PlayStation 4	January 31, 2023	MOSS	Yes	Yes	
Raiden IV x MIKADO remix	Xbox Series	January 31, 2023	MOSS	Yes	Yes	
Raiden IV x MIKADO remix	Xbox One	January 31, 2023	MOSS	Yes	Yes	
Raiden IV x MIKADO remix	Windows	January 31, 2023	MOSS	Yes	Yes	
The Legend of Heroes: Trails to Azure	Windows	March 14, 2023	Nihon Falcom	Yes	Yes	
The Legend of Heroes: Trails to Azure	Nintendo Switch	March 14, 2023	Nihon Falcom	Yes	Yes	
The Legend of Heroes: Trails to Azure	PlayStation 4	March 14, 2023	Nihon Falcom	Yes	Yes	
R-Type Final 3 Evolved	PlayStation 5	April 25, 2023	Granzella	Yes	Yes	
The Legend of Heroes: Trails into Reverie	Windows	July 7, 2023	Nihon Falcom	Yes	Yes	
The Legend of Heroes: Trails into Reverie	Nintendo Switch	July 7, 2023	Nihon Falcom	Yes	Yes	
The Legend of Heroes: Trails into Reverie	PlayStation 4	July 7, 2023	Nihon Falcom	Yes	Yes	
The Legend of Heroes: Trails into Reverie	PlayStation 5	July 7, 2023	Nihon Falcom	Yes	Yes	
The Legend of Nayuta: Boundless Trails	Windows	September 19, 2023	Nihon Falcom	Yes	Yes	
The Legend of Nayuta: Boundless Trails	Nintendo Switch	September 19, 2023	Nihon Falcom	Yes	Yes	
The Legend of Nayuta: Boundless Trails	PlayStation 4	September 19, 2023	Nihon Falcom	Yes	Yes	
Crymachina	Windows	October 24, 2023	Aquria	Yes	Yes	
Crymachina	Nintendo Switch	October 24, 2023	Aquria	Yes	Yes	
Crymachina	PlayStation 4	October 24, 2023	Aquria	Yes	Yes	
Crymachina	PlayStation 5	October 24, 2023	Aquria	Yes	Yes	
The Legend of Heroes: Trails Through Daybreak	Windows	July 5, 2024	Nihon Falcom	Yes	Yes	
The Legend of Heroes: Trails Through Daybreak	Nintendo Switch	July 5, 2024	Nihon Falcom	Yes	Yes	
The Legend of Heroes: Trails Through Daybreak	PlayStation 4	July 5, 2024	Nihon Falcom	Yes	Yes	
The Legend of Heroes: Trails Through Daybreak	PlayStation 5	July 5, 2024	Nihon Falcom	Yes	Yes	
Reynatis	Windows	September 27, 2024	FuRyu, Natsume Atari	Yes	Yes	
Reynatis	Nintendo Switch	September 27, 2024	FuRyu, Natsume Atari	Yes	Yes	
Reynatis	PlayStation 4	September 27, 2024	FuRyu, Natsume Atari	Yes	Yes	
Reynatis	PlayStation 5	September 27, 2024	FuRyu, Natsume Atari	Yes	Yes	
Ys X: Nordics	Windows	October 25, 2024	Nihon Falcom	Yes	Yes	
Ys X: Nordics	Nintendo Switch	October 25, 2024	Nihon Falcom	Yes	Yes	
Ys X: Nordics	PlayStation 4	October 25, 2024	Nihon Falcom	Yes	Yes	
Ys X: Nordics	PlayStation 5	October 25, 2024	Nihon Falcom	Yes	Yes	
The Legend of Heroes: Trails Through Daybreak II	Windows	February 14, 2025	Nihon Falcom	Yes	Yes	
The Legend of Heroes: Trails Through Daybreak II	Nintendo Switch	February 14, 2025	Nihon Falcom	Yes	Yes	
The Legend of Heroes: Trails Through Daybreak II	PlayStation 4	February 14, 2025	Nihon Falcom	Yes	Yes	
The Legend of Heroes: Trails Through Daybreak II	PlayStation 5	February 14, 2025	Nihon Falcom	Yes	Yes	
The Legend of Heroes: Trails Beyond the Horizon	Windows	January 15, 2026	Nihon Falcom	Yes	Yes	
The Legend of Heroes: Trails Beyond the Horizon	Nintendo Switch	January 15, 2026	Nihon Falcom	Yes	Yes	
The Legend of Heroes: Trails Beyond the Horizon	Nintendo Switch 2	January 15, 2026	Nihon Falcom	Yes	Yes	
The Legend of Heroes: Trails Beyond the Horizon	PlayStation 4	January 15, 2026	Nihon Falcom	Yes	Yes	
The Legend of Heroes: Trails Beyond the Horizon	PlayStation 5	January 15, 2026	Nihon Falcom	Yes	Yes	
Ys X: Proud Nordics	Nintendo Switch 2	February 20, 2026	Nihon Falcom	Yes	Yes	
Ys X: Proud Nordics	PlayStation 5	February 20, 2026	Nihon Falcom	Yes	Yes	
Ys X: Proud Nordics	Windows	February 20, 2026	Nihon Falcom	Yes	Yes	
Etrange Overlord	Nintendo Switch	March 26, 2026	BROCCOLI	Yes	Yes	
Etrange Overlord	PlayStation 4	March 26, 2026	BROCCOLI	Yes	Yes	
Etrange Overlord	PlayStation 5	March 26, 2026	BROCCOLI	Yes	Yes	
Etrange Overlord	Windows	March 26, 2026	BROCCOLI	Yes	Yes	
Brigandine: Abyss	Nintendo Switch 2	August 26, 2026	Happinet	Yes	Yes	
Brigandine: Abyss	PlayStation 5	August 26, 2026	Happinet	Yes	Yes	
Brigandine: Abyss	Windows	August 26, 2026	Happinet	Yes	Yes	
Brigandine: Abyss	Xbox Series X/S	August 26, 2026	Happinet	Yes	Yes	
Anomalith	PlayStation 5	November 12, 2026	FuRyu, Natsume Atari	Yes	Yes	
The Eminence in Shadow: Phantom Echoes	Nintendo Switch 2	2027	Team CARAVAN	Yes	Yes	
The Eminence in Shadow: Phantom Echoes	PlayStation 5	2027	Team CARAVAN	Yes	Yes	
The Eminence in Shadow: Phantom Echoes	Windows	2027	Team CARAVAN	Yes	Yes	
Astonishia Story	Nintendo Switch	2027	Daewon Media	Yes	Yes	
Astonishia Story	Nintendo Switch 2	2027	Daewon Media	Yes	Yes	
Astonishia Story	PlayStation 5	2027	Daewon Media	Yes	Yes	
Astonishia Story	Windows	2027	Daewon Media	Yes	Yes	

Prinny Presents NIS Classics
Volume	System	Release date	Included games	Ref.
Volume 1	Windows; Nintendo Switch	August 31, 2021	Phantom Brave: The Hermuda Triangle Remastered	
Volume 1	Windows; Nintendo Switch	August 31, 2021	Soul Nomad & the World Eaters	
Volume 2	Windows; Nintendo Switch	May 10, 2022	Makai Kingdom: Reclaimed and Rebound	
Volume 2	Windows; Nintendo Switch	May 10, 2022	Z.H.P. Unlosing Ranger VS Darkdeath Evilman	
Volume 3	Windows; Nintendo Switch	August 30, 2022	La Pucelle: Ragnarok	
Volume 3	Windows; Nintendo Switch	August 30, 2022	Rhapsody: A Musical Adventure	

=== Anime ===
Year	Title	Ref.
1997–1998	Cardcaptor Sakura	
2008	Persona: Trinity Soul	
2008	Our Home's Fox Deity.	
2008	Natsume's Book of Friends	
2008	Toradora!	
2009	Pandora Hearts	
2009	Umineko When They Cry	
2009	Kimi ni Todoke: From Me to You	
2010	Katanagatari	
2010	Wagnaria!!	
2010	House of Five Leaves	
2010	Arakawa Under the Bridge	
2010	Occult Academy	
2010	Zakuro	
2011	Hanasaku Iroha	
2011	Ghastly Prince Enma Burning Up	
2011	Anohana: The Flower We Saw That Day (Note: Now licensed by Aniplex of America.)	
2011	Ground Control to Psychoelectric Girl	
2011	YuruYuri	
2011	Bunny Drop	
2011	The Everyday Tales of a Cat God	
2011	The Princess and the Pilot (Note: Now licensed by Discotek Media.)	
2012	Brave 10	
2012	Daily Lives of High School Boys	
2012	Nyaruko: Crawling with Love	
2012	My Little Monster	
2012	Fusé: Memoirs of a Huntress	
2013	Love Live!	
2013	The Troubled Life of Miss Kotoura	
2013	Chronicles of the Going Home Club	
2013	Genshiken: Second Generation	
2013	The Eccentric Family	
2013	A Lull in the Sea	
2014	The Pilot's Love Song	
2014	If Her Flag Breaks	
2015	Love Live! The School Idol Movie	

== Personnel ==
Kenzo Saruhashi is the representative director and president of Nippon Ichi Software, having succeeded Tetsuhisa Seko who died in January 2025.

Takehito Harada is the chief executive officer and video game artist of subsidiary Studio ToOefuf whose art has been featured in video games such as Disgaea, Phantom Brave, Makai Kingdom, and Fate/Grand Order.
