= Etrange Overlord =

2026 video game

- Developers: Gemdrops, SuperNiche
- Publishers: Broccoli (Japan); NIS America (Worldwide)
- Producer: Sohei Niikawa
- Designer: Yuichiro Kitao
- Artist: Shinichiro Otsuka
- Platforms: Nintendo Switch, PlayStation 4, PlayStation 5, Windows
- Release: March 26, 2026
- Genre: Action role-playing

Etrange Overlord is an action role-playing game developed by Gemdrops and SuperNiche. It was released for the Nintendo Switch, PlayStation 4, PlayStation 5, and Windows in March 2026. The game was produced and directed by Sōhei Niikawa, known for his previous work at Nippon Ichi Software and as the creator of the Disgaea series.

While largely an action-RPG, Etrange Overlord combines an eclectic mix of genres; it calls itself a "Sushi Lane Musical Action Adventure". It follows its heroine Etrange as she battles against a variety of demonic, angelic, and human antagonists.

== Plot ==
Etrange Overlord follows the story of Etrange von Rosenberg, a noble initially engaged to the crown prince and with a penchant for sweets, but whose life takes a drastic turn for the worse. She is framed as a traitor by her cousin Angelina, who becomes the Prince's new fiancée. Etrange is promptly executed for conspiracy against the throne.

Finding herself in hell, Etrange's powerful dark magic and unique sense of justice allow her to win over many demons to her side as she tries to carve out a new existence for herself in the afterlife. In her quest to live her best life despite her woeful circumstances, she finds herself embroiled in encounter after encounter with tyrannical authority figures that she chooses to challenge, on her way to becoming an overlord of hell herself.

== Gameplay ==
The main focus of the game are a series of battles between Etrange's allies and her enemies. In battle, characters can move, dash, and attack by default. However, a variety of stage gimmicks mix up the options and strategies available, and there are a variety of objectives and restrictions per-map. The most novel features to Etrange Overlord are lanes (akin to conveyor belt sushi) which bring in items and power-ups at random for use. These include items that allow powerful special attacks for specific characters. A core choice in-battle is balancing attacking enemies with hunting down power-ups from lanes.

There are also side missions to undertake which give additional details on characters or unlock new food to cook. Between battles, the player can improve their team via methods such as weapon upgrades or cooking food. The characters also break out into song at times for musical theater-style performances.

The game is largely single-player, but includes support for a cooperative multiplayer mode where friends with the game can take on stages together, each controlling one character.

== Development ==
Etrange Overlord is an effort of Sohei Niikawa, known for his work at Nippon Ichi Software for decades, who left Nippon Ichi and struck out as an independent again under a new company, SuperNiche. He did so under the pen name "Roman Kitayama". Niikawa, as the driving force behind the game, worked as both producer and scenario writer. He said that the core idea was a tweak on the "villainess" genre (seen in stories such as My Next Life as a Villainess: All Routes Lead to Doom!); he wanted to tell a similar story but with no "change of heart" plot beat. Etrange was written as someone brimming with the self-confidence that she was right all along, and it was the rest of the world that was wrong.

While an independent work, Etrange Overlord has been noted to pay homage to various Nippon Ichi works, most notably the Rhapsody series (also known as Marl Kingdom), which also included musical number interludes in its games.

Artist Shinichiro Otsuka worked as the character designer for the game; he is known for being the illustrator of the manga Re:Zero − Starting Life in Another World. Noriyasu Agematsu (known for his work on Symphogear) created the theme song for the game.

Broccoli published the game in Japan, while NIS America created the localization into English and published it in other markets.

== Reception ==
Reception

Aggregate scores
Aggregator	Score
Metacritic	(PS5) 74/100 (NS) 73/100
OpenCritic	64% recommend

Review scores
Publication	Score
Hardcore Gamer	4/5
Nintendo World Report	6.5/10

Etrange Overlord received mixed or average reviews according to review aggregator Metacritic, with a 74/100. Fellow review aggregator OpenCritic assessed that the game received fair approval, being recommended by 64% of critics.

Ivanir Ignacchitti of Hardcore Gamer wrote a positive review, calling it a good first step for SuperNiche. He thought that Etrange made for a compelling and charismatic protagonist with surprising depth, combining moments of unhinged noblewoman egoism with a softer side. His main complaint was that the desert backgrounds of the earlygame hellscapes were rather bland. Jordan Rudek of Nintendo World Report was mixed on the game. He thought that the system was novel and had some strong moments, but also the battles were ultimately on the repetitive side, and that the characters were a bit too chatty for his personal taste.

Paul Skevington of RPGFan liked Etrange herself and the cast of characters, both allied and antagonistic, but thought the plot was ultimately not particularly deep, and that replaying missions to master side objectives was not a tempting way to spend time for him. He still admired the game for its flair and experimental nature, and noted there was a place regardless for shorter, compact games. Ezra Kinnell of RPGamer liked the characters and musical numbers, but disliked the core gameplay as having too few options. He also thought that for an overarching plot about palace intrigue, it revealed far too much of the truth right from the start of the game, and put other relevant plot points in skippable character side stories.

Hayes Madsen of RPGSite was unabashedly positive, calling the game "utterly delightful", perfectly-paced and with an ironic sense of humor. Jenni Lada of Siliconera was not enthusiastic about the battle gameplay, and thought that the battles became too repetitive. Despite this, she still enjoyed the game due its plot and characters, and thought that Etrange was a great protagonist from the style of the "reborn as a villainess" genre of manga and anime. She also praised the songs as "campy in the best way."
