= Yomawari: Midnight Shadows =

2017 video game

- Developer: Nippon Ichi Software
- Publishers: JP: Nippon Ichi Software; WW: NIS America; AS: Sega
- Platforms: PlayStation 4 PlayStation Vita; Microsoft Windows; Nintendo Switch; Android iOS
- Release: PlayStation 4, PlayStation Vita: JP: August 24, 2017; NA: October 24, 2017; EU: October 27, 2017; AU: November 3, 2017; Windows; October 24, 2017; The Long Night Collection: JP: October 25, 2018; EU: October 26, 2018; NA: October 30, 2018; Android, iOS: JP: August 29, 2019
- Genre: Survival horror
- Mode: Single-player

Yomawari: Midnight Shadows (Note: Known in Japan as Shin Yomawari (Japanese: 深夜廻)) is a survival horror video game developed and published by Nippon Ichi Software for PlayStation 4, PlayStation Vita and Microsoft Windows via Steam. The game is a sequel to Yomawari: Night Alone, which originally released in 2015 in Japan. It was released in Japan on August 24, 2017 and in western territories in fall 2017. It was released in Asia with Traditional Chinese subtitles under Sega.

The game was released in October 2018 for the Nintendo Switch, alongside its predecessor, as part of Yomawari: The Long Night Collection. (Note: Known as Yomawari: Night Alone & Yomawari: Midnight Shadows for Nintendo Switch (夜廻と深夜廻 for Nintendo Switch, Yomawari to Shin Yomawari for Nintendo Switch) in Japan.) The game was later ported for Android and iOS in Japan on August 29, 2019.

== Plot ==
After going to a late summer fireworks festival together in the mountains, the girls Yui and Haru got lost on the way back home. When they let go of each other's hands, they got separated. Mustering up their courage, the two girls explore an ominous night town which is completely different during daytime and where someone is lurking in the shadows. As the story advances, the player will switch between the perspectives of Yui and Haru. The actions, decisions and information you get from playing as one will impact the story of the other.

== Gameplay ==
Players explore a town at night in order to bring the two girls back together and find the way home. The only source of light is a flashlight. While exploring, the player finds items and strange 'spirits', who are lurking in various places such as shades of mountains, street corners, and below a street light, and sometimes attack the player. When a spirit is around, the girl's heartbeat will increase. Since the girls cannot fight, the player has to find ways to overcome the spirits, for example by running away, hiding, or using an item. Since each spirit has its own characteristics, the best method to use differs per spirit. Players can push large objects, such as wooden boxes, in order to create stepping stones, which enables the player to get past blockades. As the story progresses, the player finds charm-like items, called 'Omamori', which have an influence on the stats of the girls, such as making stamina harder to reduce, or increasing the girls' run speed.

== Release ==
Sega was in charge of publishing the game in Asia with Traditional Chinese subtitles, which was released on August 24, 2017.

== Reception ==
Reception

Aggregate score
Aggregator	Score
Metacritic	(Vita) 79/100 (PS4) 77/100

Review scores
Publication	Score
Destructoid	8.5/10
Famitsu	31/40
Hardcore Gamer	4/5
MeriStation	8.2/10
Metro	7/10

The PlayStation 4 and PlayStation Vita versions received "generally favorable reviews" according to the review aggregation website Metacritic. In Japan, Famitsu gave them each a score of one eight, one seven, and two eights for a total of 31 out of 40.

== Sequel ==
Yomawari: Lost in the Dark was developed and published by Nippon Ichi and released on the Nintendo Switch and PlayStation 4 on April 21, 2022 in Japan. It was released on October 25, 2022 in North America and on October 28, 2022 in Europe for the Nintendo Switch and PlayStation 4 alongside a port for Microsoft Windows.
