= Cooking Fighter Hao =

1998 video game

- Developer: Nippon Ichi Software
- Publisher: Nippon Ichi Software
- Platforms: PlayStation; Android; iOS; Windows
- Release: PlayStation: JP: May 21, 1998; Android, iOS: JP: February 13, 2024; Windows: WW: March 27, 2025
- Genre: Action game
- Modes: Single-player, Multiplayer

Cooking Fighter Hao (also known as The Blazing Chef: Cooking Fighter Hao or simply Cooking Fighter) is a 1998 action game developed and published by Nippon Ichi Software for the PlayStation only in Japan. The game takes place in a fictional version of China and players control a swordsman named Hao, who engages in cooking battles with rival chefs. The showdowns take place in the arena where Hao has to defeat the animals, collect the ingredients, and use them to prepare dishes.

It was later ported to Android and iOS in 2024. A Windows port with enhanced visuals was released via Steam in 2025; it is available for purchase worldwide, but only supports the Japanese language.

== Gameplay ==
Battles take place in an overhead screen, the characters being represented by super deformed characters. Each level has a type of animal (chicken, crab, etc.) which must be beaten with a weapon and then turned into a meal. Vegetables are strewn across the battle field that can be thrown into the meat to create a different meal and different methods of cooking can be used, thus creating a wide variety of combinations. The winner is determined by who gets the most points after the meals are cooked.

Story Mode lets the player use Hao as he battles different chefs. Free Mode allows the player choose between eleven different chefs and a second player can join.
