= Musō Tōrō =

2009 video game

- Musō Tōrō Game cover
- Developer(s): FOG Inc.
- Publisher(s): Nippon Ichi Software
- Platform(s): PlayStation Portable
- Release: JP: March 19, 2009
- Genre(s): Visual novel
- Mode(s): Single-player

Musō Tōrō (夢想灯籠) is an adventure game developed by FOG Inc. and produced by Nippon Ichi Software that was released for the PlayStation Portable on March 19, 2009. A manga adaptation of the game is being serialized in the Comp Ace magazine, starting with its May anniversary issue, out on March 26, 2009.

== Release history ==
Musō Tōrō was released in Japan on March 19, 2009, with a regular and limited edition. The limited edition included a drama CD as well as a booklet of design materials of the game. The drama CD is about 30 minutes in length while the booklet is 32 pages long. Also, six retail shops offered limited illustrated telephone cards with the orders.
