= FOG Inc. =

Japanese video game developer

- Native name: 株式会社フォグ
- Romanized name: Kabushiki gaisha Fogu
- Type: Kabushiki gaisha
- Industry: Video games
- Founded: December 2, 1996; 29 years ago
- Defunct: 2016
- Fate: Shut down
- Headquarters: Machida, Tokyo, Japan
- Products: Fuuraiki series; Missing Parts series
- Parent: Nippon Ichi Software
- Website: fog.jp

FOG Inc. (株式会社フォグ; FOG is short for Full On Games) was a Japanese video game developer based in Machida, Tokyo, and a subsidiary of Nippon Ichi Software. The company was founded on December 2, 1996. FOG is best known for developing visual novels.

== History ==
FOG Inc. was founded on December 2, 1996 in Sakuragaoka-chō, Shibuya, Tokyo. In April 1999 the company was relocated to Shin-Yokohama, in August 2009 to Kōhoku Newtown, Tsuzuki-ku, Yokohama, and in June 2012 to Machida, Tokyo. In February 2006 the company's president Noriyuki Sōsei died. In April 2016 Nippon Ichi Software acquired FOG. The company closed in December 2021

== Games by FOG ==
- Bishōjo Hanafuda Kikō: Michinoku Hitō Koi Monogatari (August 7, 1997, PlayStation)
- Kuon no Kizuna (December 3, 1998, PlayStation)
- Kuon no Kizuna: Sairinsho (May 18, 2000, Dreamcast)
- Fuuraiki (January 18, 2001, PlayStation)
- Missing Parts: The Tantei Stories Part 1 (January 17, 2002, Dreamcast)
- Kuon no Kizuna: Sairinsho (July 18, 2002, PlayStation 2)
- Missing Parts: The Tantei Stories Part 2 (October 24, 2002, Dreamcast)
- Missing Parts: The Tantei Stories Part 3 (July 31, 2003, Dreamcast)
- Missing Parts: The Tantei Stories Side A (November 27, 2003, PlayStation 2)
- Missing Parts: The Tantei Stories Side B (February 19, 2004, PlayStation 2)
- Rim Runners (January 27, 2005, PlayStation 2)
- Fuuraiki 2 (November 10, 2005, PlayStation 2)
- Fuuraiki (September 28, 2006, PlayStation 2)
- Amagōshi no Yakata (March 8, 2007, PlayStation 2)
- Naraku no Shiro: Ichiyanagi Nagomu, Nidome no Junan (March 6, 2008, PlayStation 2)
- Musō Tōrō (March 19, 2009, PlayStation Portable)
- Amagōshi no Yakata Portable: Ichiyanagi Nagomu, Saisho no Junan (September 17, 2009, PlayStation Portable)
- Naraku no Shiro Portable: Ichiyanagi Nagomu, Nidome no Junan (December 17, 2009, PlayStation Portable)
- Kōri no Haka: Ichiyanagi Nagomu, Sandome no Junan (February 25, 2010, PlayStation Portable)
- Missing Parts: The Tantei Stories Complete (November 29, 2012, PlayStation Portable)
- Fūin (March 29, 2013, Microsoft Windows)
- Fuuraiki 3 (May 31, 2013, Microsoft Windows)
- Fuuraiki 3 (February 19, 2015, PlayStation Vita)
- Fuuraiki 4 (July 8, 2021, Nintendo Switch, PlayStation 4)
