= Village in the Shade =

2026 video game

- Developer: Nippon Ichi Software
- Publisher: Nippon Ichi Software
- Platforms: Nintendo Switch; PlayStation 4; PlayStation 5; Windows
- Release: July 30, 2026: JP: July 30, 2026; WW: October 27, 2026
- Genres: Farm life sim, Survival horror
- Mode: Single-player

Village in the Shade (Note: Japanese: ほの暮しの庭) is a 2026 farm life sim survival horror game developed by Nippon Ichi Software. It was released for PlayStation 4, PlayStation 5, Nintendo Switch, Nintendo Switch 2 and Windows in Japan on July 30, 2026, and in North America and Europe on October 27, 2026, by Nippon Ichi Software America.

== Reception ==
Reception

Aggregate scores
Aggregator	Score
Metacritic	(PC) 87/100 (PS5) 84/100; NS2 89/100
OpenCritic	84% recommend (Note: Based on 20 reviews)

The game received "generally favorable" reviews according to the review aggregation website Metacritic. Fellow review aggregator OpenCritic assessed that the game received fair approval, being recommended by 84% of critics.

On August 3, Village in the Shade managed to sell 100,000 copies in Japan between physical and digital sales. After two months, it was reported that the game had managed to sell over 250,000 copies.
