= Labyrinth of Galleria: The Moon Society =

- Developer: Nippon Ichi Software
- Publisher: Nippon Ichi Software
- Designer: Tatsuya Izumi
- Programmer: Yoshiyuki Akasaka
- Artist: Takehito Harada
- Composer: Tenpei Sato
- Platforms: PlayStation 4; PlayStation Vita; Nintendo Switch; PlayStation 5; Windows
- Release: November 26, 2020: PS4; JP: November 26, 2020; NA: February 14, 2023; EU: February 17, 2023; Vita; JP: November 26, 2020; NS; JP: November 11, 2021; NA: February 14, 2023; EU: February 17, 2023; PS5; NA: February 14, 2023; EU: February 17, 2023; Win; WW: February 14, 2023
- Genre: Role-playing video game
- Mode: Single-player

Labyrinth of Galleria: The Moon Society is a role-playing video game developed and published by Nippon Ichi Software. It is the sequel to Labyrinth of Refrain: Coven of Dusk.

== Gameplay ==
A witch tasks players with exploring a labyrinth beneath her mansion. Unlike traditional first-person party-based dungeon crawlers, players control teams of adventurers. Each team consists of up to eight adventurers, and there can be up to five teams, making for combined parties of up to 40 characters. The narrative elements are similar to visual novels.

== Development ==
Labyrinth of Galleria: The Moon Society was first released in Japan. The PlayStation 4 and Vita versions were released on November 26, 2020, and the Switch version was released on November 11, 2021. In North America, the PlayStation 4, PlayStation 5, and Nintendo Switch versions were released on February 14, 2023. On the same day, the Windows version was released worldwide. The European versions of the PlayStation 4, PlayStation 5, and Nintendo Switch were released three days later.

== Reception ==
Labyrinth of Galleria: The Moon Society received positive reviews on Metacritic. RPG Site said it has "polished gameplay systems, an intriguing storyline, and a lengthy runtime", though the reviewer enjoyed Refrain's story better. Digitally Downloaded said it is "every bit as good as its predecessor was", but the elements that struck the reviewer as subversive in the first game now feel less surprising. Nintendo Life wrote that the game's complexity could be off-putting to non-hardcore gamers, but it "does a fantastic job of providing a dense and devastating journey into the depths of dungeons".
