= Hotaru no Nikki =

2014 video game

- Japanese PlayStation Vita release cover
- Developer: NIS
- Publishers: JP: NIS; WW: NIS America
- Director: Masayuki Furuya
- Designer: Masayuki Furuya
- Programmers: Atsushi Usui; Yu Kitajima; Kenta Asano; Kenta Kobayashi; Yusaku Nagayasu
- Composer: Hajime Sugie
- Platforms: PlayStation Vita, Microsoft Windows
- Release: PlayStation Vita: JP: 19 June 2014; NA: 24 February 2015; EU: 4 March 2015; Microsoft Windows: WW: May 18, 2016
- Genres: Adventure, Puzzle
- Mode: Single-player

Hotaru no Nikki (ホタルノニッキ; lit. "Firefly's Diary"), stylised as htoL#NiQ, is a 2014 video game created by Japanese game developer Nippon Ichi Software for the PlayStation Vita and Microsoft Windows. The game is directed and designed by Masayuki Furuya.

== Setting ==
The story begins on December 31, 9999, when a young amnesiac girl by the name of Mion wakes at the bottom of a dark ruins within a desolate world. Following a desire to let Mion escape the rubble and see the outside world, the firefly Lumen leads her on a journey upwards through the ruins. On her journey outwards, she finds unmanned machines, distorted vegetation, and bodies of dead children.

== Gameplay ==
In-game screenshot depicting a stage's hazards and enemies.

Within the "World of Light", the player controls a firefly named Lumen who guides a girl named Mion. Her movements are dependent on how the firefly moves, and the player aims to guide her through worlds containing various obstacles. The firefly may cause Mion to move, or perform a certain action. Meanwhile, in the "World of Shadow", the player is able to control a shadow firefly, who is able to remove objects on the game stage from behind the shadows. If the player is caught by enemies that lurk within the shadows of the ruins, or if the player is caught in traps set up throughout the levels, Mion dies. Whilst Mion is unable to physically attack enemies, the player is able to tactically exploit the surrounding environment to destroy them, for example by dropping boulders.

The game makes use of the PlayStation Vita's touch controls, with the player controlling the firefly with the front touchscreen, and the shadow firefly with the rear touchpad. The player can freely switch between the two worlds at will, and will require to use both worlds in order to clear stages. As the game progresses, the player collects memory fragments which reveal fragments of Mion's past.

== Development ==
According to Nippon Ichi Software president Sohei Niikawa, the game is a completely new and original intellectual property work, and part of a new move within the company to create a new brand and direct creative energy towards creating new games. The main staff involved with the project were prior involved in the development of the Disgaea game series. The art style of the game is reminiscent of a picture book, and revolves around themes such as death, shadow and light. The game features support for the PlayStation Vita TV. Due to frequent usage of gruesome death scenes, Hotaru no Nikki was given a rating of CERO D (17+) in Japan.

The game was localised by NIS America for release in North America and Europe, under the title htoL#NiQ: The Firefly Diary.

== Release ==
Whilst the standard version of the game is a digital-only release available as a downloadable purchase from the PlayStation Network, (Note: Sony Computer Entertainment does not publicly release data on digital sales within the PlayStation Store; rankings from both Famitsu and Media Create only chart sales data for retail software sales.) Nippon Ichi Software released a limited batch of special edition sets containing physical cartridge copies of the game through retail stores in Japan, which sold through the majority of its shipment within the first week of release, representing a sell-through of approximately 90% of all limited edition copies. A similar limited edition was released in other territories, and sold out before release. However, unlike in Japan, physical copies were produced for non limited editions. Both releases were available exclusively at NIS America's online store, and retailed for $29.99 and $19.99, respectively.

== Reception ==
Reception

Aggregate scores
Aggregator	Score	
Aggregator	PC	PS Vita
GameRankings	70.00%	60.55%
Metacritic	N/A	58/100

Review scores
Publication	Score	
Publication	PC	PS Vita
Destructoid	N/A	6/10
Famitsu	N/A	30/40
Hardcore Gamer	N/A	3.5/5
HonestGamers	3/5	N/A
GameCritics	3/5	N/A

Famitsu gave the game a review score of 30/40. Hardcore Gamer gave the game a 3.5 out of 5, saying "The fundamentals for an incredible experience are there, and yet htoL#NiQ never seems to quite capitalize on them." HonestGamers later reviewed the worldwide PC port and noted that though the control scheme was vastly improved, the game still suffered
