= Emily Wants to Play =

2015 survival horror video game

- Developer: Shawn Hitchcock
- Publisher: Hitchcock Games
- Director: Shawn Hitchcock
- Producer: Shawn Hitchcock
- Designer: Shawn Hitchcock
- Programmer: Shawn Hitchcock
- Artist: Shawn Hitchcock
- Writer: Shawn Hitchcock
- Composer: Shawn Hitchcock
- Series: Emily Wants To Play
- Engine: Unreal Engine 4
- Platforms: macOS; Windows iOS; Android; PlayStation 4 Xbox One; Oculus Rift
- Release: macOS, Windows; December 10, 2015; iOS, Android; January 30, 2016; PlayStation 4; August 9, 2016; Xbox One; September 9, 2016; Oculus Rift; October 31, 2016
- Genre: Survival horror
- Mode: Single-player

Emily Wants to Play is a 2015 survival horror video game created by indie developer Shawn Hitchcock. The game was first released for macOS and Windows on December 10, 2015. It was later released for iOS, Android, PlayStation 4, Xbox One, and Oculus Rift in 2016. A sequel titled Emily Wants to Play Too was released on December 13, 2017.

The player takes the role of a pizza delivery man that has been trapped in a house by a young girl named Emily and her three dolls. Each level of the game is represented by a different hour of the night from 11 pm until 6 am. During these levels, various combinations of the dolls and Emily appear. The player must learn how to interact with Emily and her dolls in order to survive the night.

== Gameplay ==
The game begins with the player character, a pizza delivery man, walking into a house on his last pizza delivery. Upon entering, the front door closes and is locked, presumably by Emily, since she appears for an instant in front of the door. The player must then survive the night from 11 pm until 6 am. Each hour of the game an antagonist is added in the form of a doll or Emily. The player must then figure out how to interact with each doll and Emily herself in order to survive the hours (6 minutes). If a doll or Emily attacks the player, in the form of a jump scare, then the player loses and the game is over. However, the player can retry from the beginning of the last hour. There are various clues on notes and on a whiteboard in the kitchen that help the player to learn how to handle a doll when it appears (although what's written on the whiteboard are usually lies meant to trick the player). The mechanic of each doll and Emily's game build upon each other. The player has to survive by performing tasks with the dolls in the form of children's games.

At 11 PM, the toys never attack the player. However, the player can interact with the house. However, Emily will kill the player if they go into the hole that leads to the basement(all hours in the game, except 4 AM~6 AM).

At 12 AM, Kiki (the porcelain doll) becomes hostile. When the player hears her laugh, it means she could either be right behind the player or somewhere in the room. If the player comes across her, they need to look at her until she vanishes. Only when she disappears is the player completely safe (until her laugh is audible again somewhere).

At 1 AM, Mr. Tatters (the clown doll) becomes hostile. He will laugh and make sounds to detect the player's movement. If the player remains completely still, it is possible for them to avoid being attacked. He will also come in front of the player sometimes, but under no condition must the player move or click anywhere. After some time, he will sigh and leave the player alone. Once he disappears, the player is free to move around again.

At 2 AM, Chester (the ventriloquist dummy) becomes hostile. He has a kid-like laugh. When he laughs, the player must run away from the room they're currently in to avoid being killed. The only way to escape him is by getting out of the room he is currently in.

At 3 AM, all three dolls become hostile. The player has to memorize how to deal with the dolls separately. To make it more difficult, the player may encounter two dolls at the same time.

At 4 AM, Emily (the demon-like girl) will become hostile. The player will see a timer on the bottom of the screen counting down. From this point on, the player will not be allowed to turn on any light switch. The player can, however, use a flashlight, which will make this part easier. The player can now enter the basement without getting killed instantly by Emily, since she's already active. Once the player finds Emily, they must touch her, which will cause her to disappear, resetting the timer and causing her to teleport somewhere else. This process must be repeated.

At 5 AM, Emily and her dolls will become hostile. The player must survive all of these enemies in combination.

At 6 AM, the player can leave the house.

== Plot ==
=== Emily Wants to Play ===
A month ago, two people were found dead in the living room of their house located on a street called 905 Sister Street as they were packing up to move. A pizza is ordered to the house using an online pizza delivery service by what is presumably a deceased and ghostly girl named Emily Withers. A pizza delivery man who works at a company called Checkers Pizza (a spoof of Domino's Pizza) comes to the house to fulfill the order. Details in the order explain that the door is open and to walk right in. When the pizza man walks in, announcing the delivery of the pizza, the door is closed and locked behind him. Emily briefly appears near the door when the lightning strikes, having apparently been responsible for locking the door. During his stay in the house, the pizza man encounters Emily and three living dolls named Kiki (a porcelain doll), Mr. Tatters (a clown doll), and Chester (a ventriloquist dummy). In one of the rooms, he finds a flashlight.

Emily and the dolls want to play variations of children's games with the pizza man, namely peek-a-boo, red light green light, tag and hide-and-seek, but will kill him if he makes a wrong move. A whiteboard in the kitchen tells the opposite of what he has to do to survive (although it sometimes has comments or facts that are true). There is also a laptop in the kitchen that was used to order the pizza. If the pizza man plays these games correctly and survives from 11 pm to 6 am, Emily and the dolls will let him out of the house.

According to the notes in the house, Emily was a girl who suffered depression and found comfort in the dolls in the basement. She considered the dolls her friends, but her parents wanted to take them away from her. The recordings left behind seem to be from Maggie Withers, Emily's mother, and were recorded to help with her cope with her own depression. The recordings explain that Emily acted strangely ever since they moved here, presumably because she didn't like her new home. Emily showed signs of erratic and violent behavior, which led her to harm other children at school and kill a puppy that they bought her as a gift. Because of this, her parents decided to keep her at home and lock her in the basement. During this time, Emily found the dolls, and even stranger events began occurring. The dolls started appearing around the house without anyone moving them, and Emily had opened up a giant hole in the floor of her room, which would be impossible for a small child to do. One day, Emily was found lifeless in the basement, having died of unknown circumstances, which scared the parents into planning to move to a new house.

News audio that plays on a static television explains that a couple was killed a month ago while preparing to move. These two people are presumably Emily's parents, and someone, possibly Emily's angered ghost or one of her dolls, had killed them before they could move. There are hints of a possible subplot. The phrases "Join Us" and "We Are One" can be seen written on a few notes, on the bottom of a crashed computer and heard at the end of a recording in the basement. There is also a strange figure depicted behind what looks like Emily and her dolls on the back of one of the notes.

When the pizza delivery man finally escapes, the police come back to check the house. The subsequent news report states that the pizza man is now under psychiatric evaluation, but the dolls matching his description have been recovered.

=== Emily Wants to Play Too ===
Emily Wants to Play Too begins at 6 am in the protagonist's apartment, after having a large party. The protagonist has to get to work at Timmy Thom's Fast Sandwiches (a spoof of Jimmy John's Sandwiches) by 4 pm. At this point, he decides to rest before that time. While the protagonist sleeps, he seems to have the same nightmare he has been having in his previous slumbers where he encountered Emily and her dolls. When he officially awakens, he takes a shower and washes dishes before delivering a sandwich order to a research facility known as Central Evidence. Arriving there at 7 pm, he gets locked in and witnesses Chester performing some sort of ritual. He later sees Kiki bringing Maxwell Steeles to life using a similar ritual. The protagonist's objective is to discover keycards that gain access to four area levels and survive until 7 am before he can escape Emily and her dolls and exit the building. During this time, they start a fire in the building to destroy evidence of their existence and confiscate fire extinguishers in the building. Whiteboards in the building provide hints to help the protagonist; however, some are lies used to deceive him.

The game introduces three new dolls: Weasl, Maxwell Steeles (a man disguised as a store mannequin), and Greta. The original dolls are still present. The newspaper articles found within the building explain the backstories of Emily and the six dolls, implying that they are possessed by an evil entity (presumed to be the spirit of a puppet master named Vult Ludere, who is the original owner of Kiki, Mr. Tatters, and Chester, and is possibly the figure that was depicted on one of the notes in the original game).

Apart from the default ending, there are also two alternate endings in the game. The first can be achieved during the 6 am area at the player's apartment. If the player turns off the light, he will start to get scared. If he stays like this for over a minute, noises will be heard in the dark, suggesting that the dolls are gathering around him. Finally, the local journal reports that the protagonist died because he tripped and suffered a fatal injury. The second one can be achieved when he comes inside the Central Evidence for the first time where he sees Chester performing a ritual and runs away in terror.

In the default ending, a file revealing the accident at the Central Evidence and the dolls are shown while also indicating that the protagonist is now under psychiatric evaluation. The police believe him to be responsible for the fire that destroyed Central Evidence. Because he didn't deliver the order, he lost his job. The man reading the story is hinted to be the pizza delivery man from the first game, who suggests that he should "go back to that house."

As the credits roll, Emily and her dolls face a tall figure (presumably the entity mentioned in the newspapers), saying that it won't let her out anymore and now "they are one."

=== Emily Wants to Play 3 ===
Emily Wants to Play 3 does not have a known plot yet, but what is known so far is that the pizza delivery man and the sandwich delivery man from the previous two games will return along with a new character named Emilia Ludere and members of a company called PAH Inc. Their goal is to infiltrate the house that Emily Withers previously lived in. All enemies from the first two games will also return along with a new villain: Vult Ludere, the ghost influencing Emily and her dolls, who is also a possible relative of Emilia's due to them sharing the same last name.

== Development ==
The developer, Shawn Hitchcock, announced that he will be releasing Emily Wants to Play on PlayStation 4 and Xbox One, creating a VR update and a sequel titled Emily Wants to Play Too.

== Future ==
A sequel, titled Emily Wants to Play 3, has been confirmed, though no release date has been given.

== Reception ==
Reception

Aggregate score
Aggregator	Score
Metacritic	75/100

Review score
Publication	Score
Digitally Downloaded	7/10

For the original game (Emily Wants to Play), review aggregator Metacritic found that the game received "generally favourable reviews". Digitally Downloaded praised the effectiveness of the game's jumpscares but ultimately found it "difficult to get invested" in.
