= The Princess Guide (video game) =

2018 action role-playing game

- Developer: Nippon Ichi Software
- Publishers: WW: Nippon Ichi Software; EU: NIS America
- Platforms: PlayStation 4, Nintendo Switch
- Release: JP: March 8, 2018; NA: March 26, 2019; EU: March 29, 2019
- Genres: Action role-playing, raising sim
- Mode: Single-player

The Princess Guide (あなたの四騎姫教導譚, Anata no Shikihime Kyōdōtan) is an action role-playing video game and raising sim developed and published by Nippon Ichi Software. It was released on March 8, 2018, in Japan, and in March 2019 in North America and Europe for PlayStation 4 and Nintendo Switch. Taking the role of a veteran soldier, the player must choose one of four princesses to tutor in combat and fight against the adversary besieging their kingdom. The game received mixed reviews from critics, who praised it as having potential but criticized it as too shallow and with too low a budget.

== Reception ==
The Princess Guide received an aggregate score of 54/100 for the PlayStation 4 version and 57/100 for the Nintendo Switch version on Metacritic.

CJ Andriessen of Destructoid rated the Switch version of the game 5.5/10, saying that while it has a "sound structure" and "clever ideas", it was "burdened" by its small issues. He called the game's save system "archaic" and cited a crash that made him lose a large amount of progress.

Nathan Lee of RPGFan rated the PlayStation 4 version of the game 50/100, saying that the idea of the game sounded "cool" and that it had potential, but that the game lacked the budget to support it. He called the gameplay "pretty boring", saying that while it got more rewarding in the second half of the game, he never found it particularly interesting overall. He also criticized the game's voice acting, singling out that it did not receive an English dub, and that the Japanese voice acting was repetitive for every minor character besides the princesses.

James Galizio of RPG Site rated the same version 40/100, saying that it was much more unfulfilling than the preview he had played. He praised the aesthetic, animation and music of the game, but criticized its combat as "monotonous" and called the guiding aspects of the game an afterthought, saying that the game felt "hollow".
