= Sōhei Niikawa =

Japanese video game developer and executive

Sōhei Niikawa (Japanese: 新川宗平, Hepburn: Niikawa Sōhei) is a Japanese video game developer and executive known for creating the Disgaea series. He joined Nippon Ichi Software in 1996, and was its CEO and president from 2009 to 2022.

In March 2025, Niikawa announced that he had founded a new company, SuperNiche. Two games were listed as them being involved with: an adaptation of Etrange Overlord where they were working with developer Gemdrops in production, and an untitled production. It later emerged that after his resignation in 2022, Niikawa shopped around game pitches, manga scripts, and novels under the pen name "Roman Kitayama". The eventual result was Etrange Overlord, which was credited to Kitayama (really Niikawa) as author.

== Works ==
- Dual Orb: Seireiju Densetsu (1993)
- Rhapsody: A Musical Adventure (1998)
- Disgaea: Hour of Darkness (2003)
- Etrange Overlord (2026)
- Demons Night Fever (2026)
