= Ape Escape (video game) =

1999 video game

- North American PlayStation cover art
- Developer: Sony Computer Entertainment Japan
- Publisher: Sony Computer Entertainment
- Director: Masamichi Seki
- Producers: Susumu Takatsuka; Takafumi Fujisawa
- Designers: Kenkichi Shimooka; Hingo Matsumoto; Katsuyuki Kanetaka; Kenji Kaido
- Programmer: Yuji Yamada
- Composer: Soichi Terada
- Series: Ape Escape
- Platforms: PlayStation; PlayStation Portable
- Release: PlayStation: WW: June 22, 1999; JP: June 24, 1999; PlayStation Portable: JP: March 17, 2005; NA: March 24, 2005; EU: May 5, 2006
- Genres: Platform, action-adventure
- Mode: Single-player

Ape Escape (Note: Known as Saru! Get You! (サルゲッチュ, Saru Getchu) in Japan) is a 1999 platform game developed and published by Sony Computer Entertainment for the PlayStation. The first game in the Ape Escape series, the game tells the story of an ape named Specter who gains enhanced intelligence and a malevolent streak through the use of an experimental helmet. Specter produces an army of apes, which he sends through time in an attempt to rewrite history. Spike, (Note: Named Kakeru in the Japanese version) the player character, sets out to capture the apes with the aid of special gadgets.

Ape Escape is played from a third-person perspective. Players use a variety of gadgets to pursue and capture the apes, traversing across several environments. The game's controls are heavily centered around the analog sticks, being the first game to require the use of the PlayStation's DualShock controller. Development of Ape Escape lasted over two years, and was generally focused on adapting to the use of the controller, which was a significant challenge for the development team.

Ape Escape was met with critical acclaim from critics, with praise particularly directed at the innovative use of the dual analog controls, as well as the graphics and music; the voice acting received minor criticism. The game is widely considered to be one of the greatest on the PlayStation console, and received several re-releases. The game also spawned numerous sequels and spin-offs, beginning with Ape Escape 2 in 2002. A remake, Ape Escape P, (Note: Known as Saru! Get You P! (サルゲッチュP!, Saru Getchu P!) in Japan, and as Ape Escape: On the Loose in North America) was released for the PlayStation Portable in 2005 to mixed reviews.

== Gameplay ==
In Ape Escape, players are tasked with pursuing and capturing fleeing apes, using gadgets such as the Time Net.

Ape Escape is a platform and action-adventure game viewed from a third-person perspective. For most of the game, players control Spike, a boy tasked with pursuing and capturing the apes. To do so, players use gadgets such as the Stun Club against enemies and the Time Net to transport apes. More gadgets become available as players progress. Players also control vehicles like a rubber raft, which allows water travel, and the water net, which assists in underwater traversal. The controls are centered around the analog sticks: the left stick moves players, while the right manipulates gadgets.

The apes are equipped with helmets, which feature a siren representing their alarm level: blue means relaxed, and unaware of the player characters' presence; yellow is alert; and red indicates fully alarmed, resulting in attempting to escape or becoming hostile. An ape's personality can also be determined by the colour of shorts: yellow is standard, light blue means timid, and red represents aggressive. Some apes are equipped with weaponry, allowing them to attack players, or binoculars that allow them to identify players from long distances. Players are required to capture a specific number of apes to clear a level; remaining apes can be captured upon revisiting the level.

When players take damage, they lose a life. Players can recharge their health by collecting cookies. Throughout the game, players can gather Specter Coins, which can be found in hidden locations in each stage. Collecting enough Specter Coins unlocks three bonus mini-games: Ski Kidz Racing, a skiing game in which players race against opponents; Galaxy Monkey, a shoot 'em up where players fight against aliens; and Specter Boxing, a boxing game where players dodge and punch using the analog sticks.

== Plot ==
The story begins when Specter, a white-haired monkey who is well known at his home in a monkey-themed amusement park, puts on a Monkey/Peak Point Helmet created by a Professor, which increases his intelligence beyond that of a regular monkey but, due to it being a prototype version, also twists his mind, turning him evil. Imbued with this new power, Specter gives Monkey Helmets to all the monkeys in the park and sets them loose, having them take over the local laboratory where the Professor and his assistant Katie (Note: Named Natalie in the North American version and Natsumi in the Japanese version (and the PAL version of Ape Escape P)) are currently building a time machine. As Spike and his best friend Buzz (Note: Named Jake in the North American version (and the PAL version of Ape Escape P) and Hiroki in the Japanese version) arrive at the laboratory, they find themselves transported by Specter, along with all the other monkeys, to the various reaches of time. Realizing that leaving the monkeys to their own devices could rewrite history in disastrous ways, the Professor tasks Spike with finding all of the monkeys scattered across time and sending them back to the present.

Spike must also face off against Specter, who has not only built himself an advanced Monkey Helmet further increasing his own intelligence but has also brainwashed Jake to his side. After a lengthy series of captures and battles in segments of history ranging from the age of the dinosaurs, medieval times, and the present day, Spike is eventually able to capture all of the apes. Spike chases Specter to his deranged theme park, where he is holding a recently captured Professor, Katie, and his friend Buzz. Spike frees Jake of his mind control, and releases both the professor and Katie, and goes on to find Specter in an alternative universe he calls the "Peak Point Matrix". Spike defeats Specter after a final battle, and he is captured and sent back to the zoo.

== Development and release ==
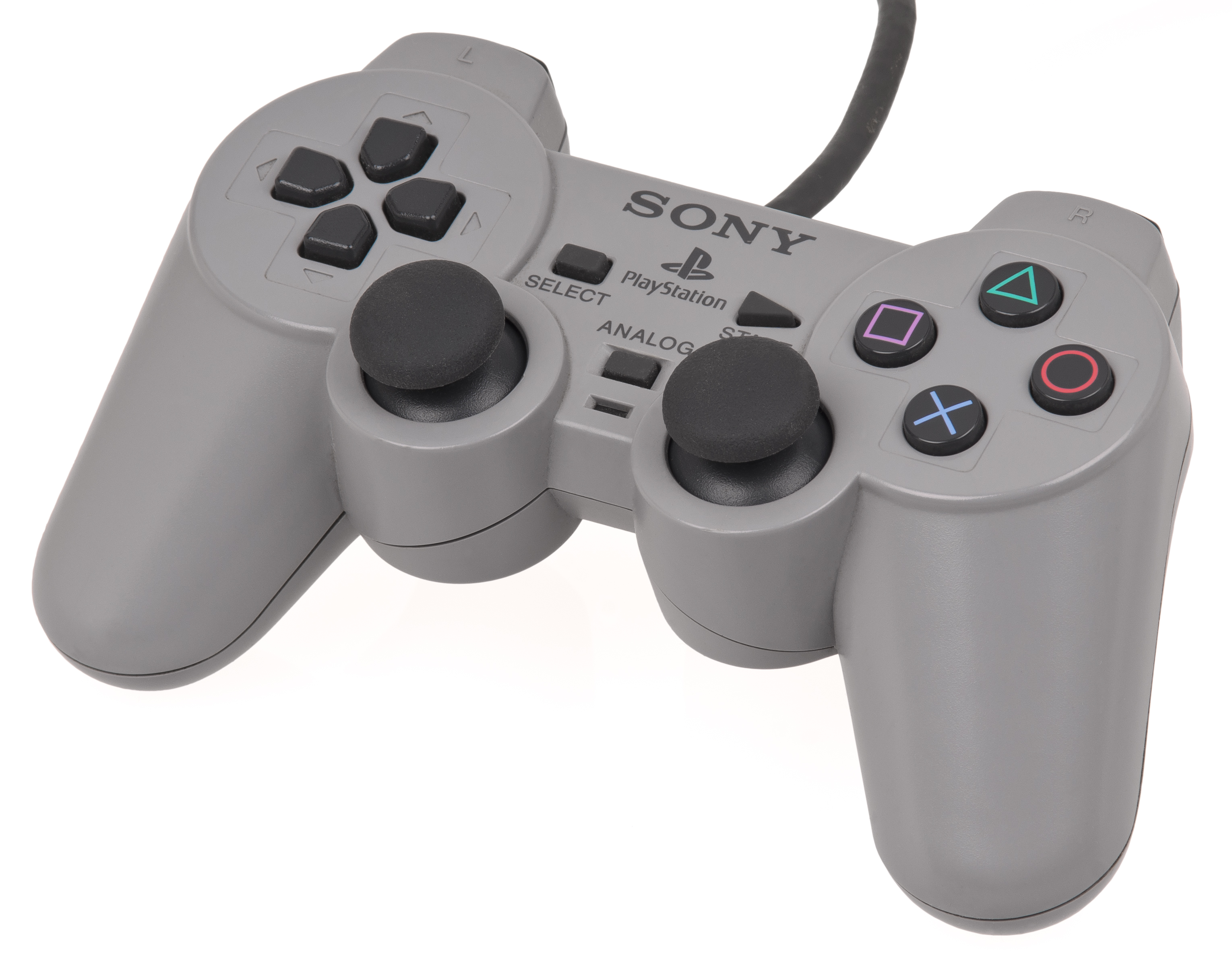
Ape Escape is the first game to require the use of the DualShock for gameplay.

A 25-person development team created Ape Escape over approximately 2.5 years. A team of three worked on the original prototype, led by producer Susumu Takatsuka, who had moved from Sega AM2; the other two, Yuji Yamada and Takamitsu Iijima, were recent graduates, and later became the game's lead programmer and character designer, respectively. They set out to create a 3D, open-field sandbox game similar to Super Mario 64. When executive producer Shuhei Yoshida joined development, he and Takatsuka hired experienced designer Kenji Kaido, initially as an associate producer and later a lead designer. Two designers, Hingo Matsumoto and Kenkichi Shimooka, were originally assigned to the game; Katsuyuki Kanetaka joined about a year into development. Most of the team consisted of largely inexperienced part-time college students, recent graduates, and participants of Sony's Net Yaroze project.

Shortly after the team began conceiving the game's concept, they attended a meeting about the development of the DualShock. Intrigued by its potential, they implemented its use in Ape Escape, making it the first game to require the use of the DualShock for gameplay. Conceptualizing the controls for the analog sticks was the team's greatest challenge; the controls underwent great testing prior to finalization. Believing players would get confused and lost in the 3D worlds, the team conceptualized having various animals to chase, serving as a clear objective to help players navigate its large, open areas. Due to the popularity of the Pipo monkey design by artist Takamitsu Iijima, they chose to focus only on monkeys. Iijima gave them helmets so players could easily see them from afar. The monkeys originally dropped feces when being chased, but this was replaced with slippery banana skins. To entice the player to capture all the monkeys and create replay value, each one was given a name and personality.

The game's music was composed by Soichi Terada, who wrote it on an Akai S1000 digital sampler, alongside an NEC computer and various synthesisers. After a game director listened to Terada's track "Sumo Jungle", he was given the opportunity to compose the music for Ape Escape. He wrote many tracks with high-speed tempos to fit with the characters' constant running. At the suggestion of producer Susumu Takatsuka, the music was designed to be interactive and playful; for example, entering sneaking mode causes the drum and bass to cut out, giving it a mellow atmosphere. Music from the game was included in Ape Escape Originape Soundtracks, (Note: Ape Escape Originape Soundtracks (サルゲッチュ・オリジサル・サウンドトラック)) published on November 18, 2011, by Terada's label Far East Recording. The gameplay sound effects were designed by Masaaki Kaneko, while the sound effects in the cutscenes were provided by Masatoshi Mizumachi. The English voice acting was recorded at Dubey Tunes Studios in San Francisco, California, with Sara Holihan and Hunter A. Pipes III serving as voice-over director and producer, respectively.

Ape Escape was announced in the April 1999 issue of Official U.S. PlayStation Magazine. A playable demonstration was integrated into the Jampack Summer '99 compilation CD released by PlayStation Underground. A second playable demonstration was included on a promotional compilation disc released by Pizza Hut on November 14. Promotions for the game were held on Cartoon Network during Sony's winter holiday marketing campaign of 1999. The game was released in North America and PAL regions on June 22, 1999, and in Japan on June 24. A remake, titled Ape Escape: On the Loose, was announced on May 11, 2004, during Sony's press conference at the Electronic Entertainment Expo. It was released for the PlayStation Portable (PSP) in Japan on March 17, 2005, in North America as a launch title on March 24, and in Europe on May 5, 2006. The remake features altered controls, due to the lack of a right analog stick on the PSP, as well as some slightly different graphics and mini-games.

== Reception ==
=== Critical reception ===
PlayStation version

Aggregate score
Aggregator	Score
Metacritic	90/100

Review scores
Publication	Score
AllGame	4.5/5
Edge	7/10
Famitsu	8/10, 8/10, 8/10, 8/10
GameRevolution	B+
GameSpot	8.8/10
IGN	9.5/10
Next Generation	5/5

Ape Escape received "universal acclaim", according to the review aggregator website Metacritic, based on 19 reviews. Reviewers praised the game's use of analog controls, as well as its graphics and music, with minor criticism directed towards the voice acting.

GameRevolution's Johnny Liu considered the innovative controls one of the standout features. GameSpot's Peter Bartholow found them "beautifully executed" and easy to use, and IGN's Doug Perry felt, while initially difficult, the analog sticks became "new and refreshing". AllGame's Scott Alan Marriott similarly found controls improved over time and praised the raft movement. Edge credited the distinct stages and original weapons, concluding that Ape Escape "offers enough novelty to make it worth serious consideration for anyone tired of the many me-too platformers". Next Generation felt the "general light-hearted cuteness makes it ideal for younger players, but its originality and challenge will also appeal to the most jaded hardcore players". Famitsu complimented the tag-like gameplay and general movement; two reviewers found the analog stick controls innovative but demanded familiarity.

GameSpot's Bartholow praised the visuals, naming the game "a sight to behold" and commending the use of colour and detail. IGN's Perry wrote the textures "aren't terribly stunning" and found the character design "rather fundamental", but felt the game's lighting and camera blended to create "a fantastic and gratifying effect". GameRevolution's Liu named the graphics "good, but not the best", noting frame rate slowdown. AllGame's Marriott similarly mentioned pop-up issues and other glitches, but ultimately commended the graphics, noting the "distinct Japanese style". A Famitsu reviewer found the graphics merely acceptable but that it added to the overall charm.

AllGame's Marriott praised the appropriateness of the music to the setting, and GameSpot's Bartholow applauded the soundtrack's interactivity. GameRevolution's Liu felt the music improves as the game progresses, similarly commending its use with gameplay. IGN's Perry described the soundtrack as "a weird concoction of J-pop and techno-synth" and found the "poppy tunes" catchier than the "techno tunes". Criticism was directed at the voice acting; GameSpot's Bartholow described it as "uniformly atrocious", while IGN's Perry referred to Spike's voice as "nothing special". The game's other sound effects, such as the ape noises, were met with positive reactions.

==== PlayStation Portable version ====
PlayStation Portable version

Aggregate score
Aggregator	Score
Metacritic	66/100

Review scores
Publication	Score
1Up.com	C
GameSpot	7.3/10
GameSpy	3.5/5
IGN	7/10

Ape Escape: On the Loose received "mixed or average reviews" according to Metacritic, based on 35 critics. Jeff Gerstmann of GameSpot lamented the loss of the "finely tuned control" of the original, but felt that the game "still has considerable charm". GameSpy's David Chapman felt that, despite the noticeable flaws of the game, particularly the controls, it still remains "a lot of fun to play". Juan Castro of IGN praised the game's use of colour, noting its enhancement on the PlayStation Portable screen. Castro also warned that "fans of the series will probably miss the second analog stick", but felt that the gadgets mapped to the PSP's face buttons would suffice. 1Up.com's Jeremy Parish criticised the porting of the game for being outdated, declaring it "a game that was better in another time, on another system, ported simply for cynical convenience". Parish felt that On the Loose served "to blemish the PSP's reputation ... as a dumping ground for warmed over 32-bit offerings far beyond their sell-by date".

=== Sales ===
Ape Escape sold 70,000 copies in Japan in its first three days, over 293,000 copies by the year's end, and more than 500,000 overall. It sold more than 600,000 copies in the United States, and earned the Greatest Hits label. By July 2003, it had sold 1.4 million copies worldwide. On the Loose debuted at ninth on the Japanese weekly charts, sold over 250,000 copies by July 2006, also earning the Greatest Hits label.

== Legacy ==
Ape Escape is considered one of the most significant titles on the PlayStation console. IGN's Perry declared it "the best 3D platform game on the PlayStation", and GameSpot's Bartholow named it "one of the best 3D platformers to date". AllGame's Marriott described it as "one of the most enjoyable 3D platform games" on the PlayStation. IGN included Ape Escape in an article documenting the greatest PlayStation 3D platform games, and later named it the eighth greatest game on the console. In March 2004, Official UK PlayStation Magazine named it the ninth greatest game of all time. Game Informer ranked it 100 on its list of best games in 2001, praising its gameplay and innovation.

Ape Escape spawned a series of games, including sequels and spin-offs. A direct sequel, Ape Escape 2, was released for the PlayStation 2 (PS2) in July 2001, followed by Ape Escape 3 for PS2 in July 2005. Several spin-off titles were released exclusively in Japan: Pipo Saru 2001 in July 2001 and Saru! Get You! Million Monkeys in July 2006 for the PS2, followed by Saru Get You: Pipo Saru Racer in December 2006 and Saru! Get You! SaruSaru Big Mission in July 2007 for the PSP. Another spin-off, Ape Quest, was also released worldwide for PSP in January 2008. A series of party games has also been released: Ape Escape: Pumped & Primed in July 2004 and EyeToy: Monkey Mania in August 2004 for PS2, as well as Ape Academy 2 for PSP in December 2005, and PlayStation Move Ape Escape for the PlayStation 3 in December 2010.

Spike is available as a playable character in PlayStation All-Stars Battle Royale (2012), and an ape costume is available as a downloadable outfit in some of the LittleBigPlanet games (2008–2012). A mini-game featuring an ape from Ape Escape is included in Metal Gear Solid 3: Snake Eater (2004) and the PlayStation 5 and Windows versions of its remake Metal Gear Solid Delta: Snake Eater (2024). Astro Bot (2024) features a dedicated Ape Escape level in which the player, dressed as Spike, captures apes; several apes are also available as collectible "Bots" and Spike and Specter as "Special Bots".

Ape Escape was added to the Deluxe tier of the PlayStation Plus lineup in May 2022, playable on PlayStation 4 and PlayStation 5 with full Trophy support. On the Loose was added in August 2023.
