= Ape Escape (disambiguation) =

Ape Escape is a series of video games developed primarily by SCE Japan Studio and published by Sony Computer Entertainment.

Ape Escape may also refer to:

- Ape Escape (video game), the first game in the series
- Ape Escape (American TV series), a 2009 American animated series of television shorts for Nicktoons based on the video games
- Ape Escape (Japanese TV series), a 2002 series of computer-generated anime television shorts for Tokyo TV based on the video games
- Saru Get You -On Air-, also known as Ape Escape -On Air-, a 2006 Japanese CGI-anime television series produced by Xebec (now Sunrise Beyond), and based on the video games
