= Ape Escape Academy =

2004 video game

- North American box art
- Developers: Shift; Alvion (Note: Additional work by Sony Computer Entertainment Japan.)
- Publisher: Sony Computer Entertainment
- Series: Ape Escape
- Platform: PlayStation Portable
- Release: JP: December 30, 2004; EU: September 1, 2005; NA: January 17, 2006
- Genre: Party
- Modes: Single-player, multiplayer

Ape Escape Academy, also known as Ape Academy in Europe and Piposaru Academia: Dossari! Sarugē Daizenshū (Note: Japanese: ピポサルアカデミ〜ア どっさり!サルゲー大集合, Hepburn: Piposaru Akademi〜a Dossari! Sarugē Daizenshū) in Japan, is a party video game developed by Shift and Alvion and published by Sony Computer Entertainment for the PlayStation Portable. It consists of a collection of 47 mini-games, many of which borrow from elements of Ape Escape 2. The game was first released in Japan in 2004, in Europe in 2005 and North America in 2006. By utilizing the PSP's Wi-Fi capabilities, up to 4 players can play at a time. The North American release was on the same day as Ape Escape 3.

A sequel, Ape Escape Academy 2, was released in Japan and Europe, but not in North America.

== Gameplay ==
A monkey working for Specter, the player must work up from junior class to senior class by playing mini games by meeting certain criteria for each class. There are 9 mini games in each class to complete. Failing to meet the criteria rewards the player with an X, while meeting the criteria rewards an O, similar to tic-tac-toe.

Each level has a certain number of lines required to pass the class (one line consists of 3 Os, either horizontally, vertically or diagonal). The game also offers review lessons for players that have almost met the requirements. Usually, these are mini-games that the player has failed previously.

== Reception ==
Reception

Aggregate score
Aggregator	Score
Metacritic	51/100

Review scores
Publication	Score
Electronic Gaming Monthly	4.83/10 (Note: Two critics of Electronic Gaming Monthly gave the game each a score of 4.5/10, and the other gave it 5.5/10)
Eurogamer	4/10
Famitsu	27/40
Game Informer	7/10
GameRevolution	D+
GameSpot	6.1/10
GameSpy	2/5
GameZone	6.7/10
Hardcore Gamer	2.75/5
IGN	5.5/10
Official U.S. PlayStation Magazine	1/5
Pocket Gamer	2.5/5
Detroit Free Press	1/4
The Times	3/5

The game received "mixed" reviews according to the review aggregation website Metacritic. Many reviewers criticized the difficulty of most of the mini-games, as the controls were not explained fully, often leading to a failure during the first run in these minigames, but generally liked the variations in the available mini-games. In Japan, Famitsu gave it a score of one six and three sevens for a total of 27 out of 40.

Game Informer noted how the game focuses on mini games like the WarioWare series, said the game does give some quick thrills, and criticized the loading times between games diminishing the fast-paced feel in comparison to the WarioWare games; the magazine concluded: "Still, this unambiguous title manages to (mostly) hit its target." GamePro said that the mini-games "look nice, but just can't compete with Wario Ware's [sic] non-stop style of play that is best suited for the stylus-equipped DS." (Note: GamePro gave the game 4/5 for graphics, 3.5/5 for sound, 2.5/5 for control, and 3/5 for fun factor.)

The Times gave it a score of three stars out of five, saying, "With more than 45 mini-games in the mix, it is not surprising that the quality of them is fairly mixed — it is Ape Academy's major weakness that while many are rather too easy (the one-metre dash, for instance), others seem impossible (catching the contents of a kebab on a sword)." Entertainment Weekly gave it a C+, saying, "Most of these minigames are fun and challenging, but the lack of a plot can leave you wondering just where you're going with the gameplay — and some become insanely hard after a couple starter rounds." However, The Sydney Morning Herald gave it two stars out of five, saying, "Ape Academy's pace is languid. Frequent, lengthy loading delays frustrate, and many of the 50 challenges suffer from clumsy controls, ambiguous instructions, or are just dull." Detroit Free Press gave it one star out of four, saying, "Throw in some excessive load times and a lame several-players-on-one handheld multiplayer mode and you have a barrel of frustration."

It is believed that because of this game's lackluster reception, the future of the Ape Escape series in the North America is uncertain, as successive titles in the series (such as Ape Escape Racer and Ape Escape Million Monkeys) have yet to receive a North American release. However, Ape Quest was released for download for the PSP on the PlayStation Store in Japan & the US.

== See also ==
- Ape Escape
- Ape Academy 2
