= Tomoe Hanba =

Japanese voice actress

- 半場 友恵
- Born: June 9, 1972 (age 54); Tokyo, Japan
- Occupation: Voice actress
- Years active: 1995–present
- Agent: Arts Vision
- Spouse: Jin Yamanoi

Tomoe Hanba (半場 友恵, Hanba Tomoe; born June 9, 1972) is a Japanese voice actress associated with Arts Vision. She is the official Japanese dubbing voice for Velma Dinkley in the Scooby-Doo franchise and is known for voicing Etna in the Disgaea video game franchise. as well as Welch Vineyard in Star Ocean video games.

== Filmography ==
=== Anime ===
List of voice performances in anime
| Year | Title | Role | Notes | Source |
|---|---|---|---|---|
| | Crayon Shin-chan | Takuya, Waitress | | |
| 1996 | Brave Command Dagwon | Boy | | |
| 1996 | B-Fighter Kabuto | Bit | | |
| 1997 | King of Braves Gaogaigar | Mikoto Utsugi | | |
| 1997 | Hareluya II Boy | Megumi Aihara 愛原めぐみ | | |
| 1997 | Shinkai Densetsu Meremanoid | Jose | | |
| 1997 | Berserk | Collette | | |
| 1998 | Silent Moebius | Girl | | |
| 1998 | Shangda's Kingdom Gandhara | Linda | | |
| 1998 | Marvelous Melmo | Hitomi, Chiyoko Yabe | Renewal version | |
| 1998 | Steam Detectives | Girl | | |
| 1999 | Microman: The Small Giant | Asami Mizusawa 水沢麻美 | | |
| 1999 | Iketeru Futari | Maki Amakasu | | |
| 1999 | ∀ Gundam | Flex フレックル | | |
| 1999 | Great Teacher Onizuka | Hidemi Ota | | |
| 1999 | Blue Submarine No. 6 | Mutio ミューティオ | OVA ep. 3 | |
| 1999 | Cyborg Kuro-chan | Okada Chieko 岡田チエコ | | |
| 1999 | Jibaku-kun | Rin リン | | |
| 2000 | The Candidate for Goddess | Phil Phleira Deed | | |
| 2000 | King of Braves Gaogaigar Final | Mikoto Utsugi | OVA | |
| 2000 | Hamtaro | Kurihara Kurumi 栗原くるみ | 2代目 | |
| 2000 | Ghost Stories | Kinjiro Ninomiya, Miyo Kiyohara | | |
| 2001 | Tales of Eternia: The Animation | Minima ミニマ | | |
| 2001 | Super Gals! | Kimidori キミドリ | | |
| 2001 | Star Ocean EX | Precis F. Neumann | | |
| 2001 | Sister Princess | Yotsuba | | |
| 2001 | Great Dangaioh | Jun Midorikawa 緑川潤 | | |
| 2001 | Shaman King | Macchi | | |
| 2001 | Final Fantasy: Unlimited | Aura, Kupo, Pepo | | |
| 2001 | Geisters | Shai Tanna | | |
| 2001 | Kirby: Right Back at Ya! | Sirica | | |
| 2001 | Kokoro Library | Misato deep sea 深海みさと | | |
| 2002 | Full Metal Panic! | Mayuko Uchida | | |
| 2002 | Tokyo Mew Mew | Satsuki Toshino / Saioniji Temple Kanna 只野さつき/西園寺カンナ | | |
| 2002 | Mao-chan | Kohkijima Kuko 築島空子 | | |
| 2002 | Princess Tutu | Hermia (bottom) ハーミア（ボトム） | | |
| 2002 | Midnight Horror School | Inky, Noisy | | |
| 2002 | Sister Princess: RePure | Yotsuba | | |
| 2002 | Naruto | Yakumo Kurama | | |
| 2002 | Haibane Renmei | Sumika | | |
| 2002 | Pokémon: Advanced | Haruka's Squirtle, Chansey, Butterfree ハルカのゼニガメ、ラッキー、バタフリー | 他にも何匹かポケモンの声をしている | |
| 2003 | Gunparade March | Mori Seki | | |
| 2003 | The Mythical Detective Loki Ragnarok | Ayako Wada 和田綾子 | | |
| 2003 | Astro Boy | Tatsuo Nishino 西野達夫 | | |
| 2003 | Last Exile | Luciola | | |
| 2003 | Scrapped Princess | Cz, Cin | | |
| 2003 | Detective School Q | Makoto 真琴 | | |
| 2003 | Gad Guard | Isa | | |
| 2003–2004 | Let's go straight. ja:まっすぐにいこう。 | Sora | | |
| 2003 | PoPoLoCrois | Luna | | |
| 2003 | Twin Spica | Kasane Shibata | | |
| 2004 | Hamtaro | Kurumi-chan くるみちゃん | | |
| 2004 | Sorely! Zukkoke Threesome それいけ！ズッコケ三人組 | Princess Kushina クシナ姫 | | |
| 2004 | Gankutsuou: The Count of Monte Cristo | Franz (boyhood) フランツ（少年時代） | | |
| 2004 | Bleach | Asage | | |
| 2005 | Majime ni Fumajime: Kaiketsu Zorori | Milly | | |
| 2005 | Elemental Gelade | Viro | | |
| 2005 | King of Braves Gaogaigar Final: Grand Glorious Gathering | Mikoto Utsugi, Pirnus 卯都木命/ピルナス | | |
| 2005 | Cluster Edge | Girl | | |
| 2005 | Black Cat | Tanya | | |
| 2005 | Gaiking: Legend of Daiku-Maryu | Rosa Vice President, Diamond's mother | | |
| 2006 | Kage Kara Mamoru! | Momor of a boyhood 少年時代のマモル | | |
| 2006 | Yomigaeru Sora – Rescue Wings | Natsuko Inoue 井上奈津子 | | |
| 2006 | Makai Senki Disgaea | Etna | | |
| 2006 | Ray the Animation | Sayaka Ohyama | | |
| 2006 | Saru Get You -On Air- | Haruka, Teacher Monkey | 2 seasons | |
| 2006 | Shinseiki Duel Masters Flash | Swan, Professor Kinugawa | | |
| 2006 | The Third: The Girl with the Blue Eye | Lazuli ラザリ | | |
| 2006 | Ghost Slayers Ayashi | Younger brother 弟 | | |
| 2007 | Hidamari Sketch | Kishi Maiko 岸麻衣子 | | |
| 2007 | Zero Duel Masters | Septen セプテン | | |
| 2007 | Big Windup! | Naoe Mihashi | | |
| 2007 | Duel Masters Zero | Septen セプテン | | |
| 2008 | Ikki ja:のらみみ | A clinic 更科 | | |
| 2008 | Soul Eater | Stein (boy) | | |
| 2008 | Glass Maiden | Yuko ユーコ | | |
| 2008 | Hidamari Sketch x 365 | Kishi Maiko 岸麻衣子 | | |
| 2008 | Ikki 2 ja:のらみみ2 | A clinic 更科 | | |
| 2008–2010 | Stitch! | Tarou, Adult Lilo | 3 seasons | |
| 2008 | Kiss × Sis | Mother | OVA | |
| 2009 | Fullmetal Alchemist: Brotherhood | Gracia Hughes | | |
| 2009 | Kimi ni Todoke | Haruka Katayama 片山はるか | 徹の婚約者 | |
| 2010 | Big Windup!: Sumer Tournament Edition | Naoe Mihashi | | |
| 2010 | Kiss × Sis | Mother | TV series | |
| 2011 | The Idolmaster | Haruka's mother 春香の母 | 半場友恵名義 | |
| 2012 | Black Rock Shooter | Yomi's mother ヨミの母 | 半場友恵名義 | |
| 2015 | Aquarion Logos | Hayasuki (early childhood) 灰吹 陽（幼少期） | 半場友恵名義 | |
| 2015 | Sailor Moon Crystal | Calaveras | | |
| 2022 | Delicious Party Pretty Cure | Mem-Mem, Kokone's Aunt | | |
| 2022 | JoJo's Bizarre Adventure: Stone Ocean | Enrico Pucci (Young) | ONA | |
| 2023 | Junji Ito Maniac: Japanese Tales of the Macabre | Koko Shinozaki | | |

=== Film ===
List of voice performances in film
| Year | Title | Role | Notes | Source |
|---|---|---|---|---|
| 1999 | Happy Birthday Lifetime moment ja:ハッピーバースデー 命かがやく瞬間 | Makiko Nomura 野村真智子 | | |
| 1999 | Microman: The Small Giant: Great fierce battle! Microman VS strongest warrior Gorgon 小さな巨人ミクロマン 大激戦！ミクロマンVS最強戦士ゴルゴン | Asami Mizusawa 水沢麻美 | | |
| 2004 | Howl's Moving Castle | No name 役名なし | | |
| 2005 | Pokémon: Lucario and the Mystery of Mew | Squirtle ゼニガメ | | |
| 2006 | Detective Conan: The Private Eyes' Requiem | Excellent 優 | | |
| 2006 | Pokémon Ranger and the Temple of the Sea | Turtle ゼニガメ | | |
| 2007 | Go! Anpanman: Purun of the Bubble Ball | Hacky ハッキー | | |
| 2008 | GeGeGe no Kitarō: Explosive Japan!! | Maya Hibino 日比野マヤ | | |
| 2014 | Detective Conan: Dimensional Sniper | Library employee | | |
| 2019 | Lupin the IIIrd: Fujiko Mine's Lie | Gene ジーン | | |

=== Video games ===
List of voice performances in video games
| Year | Title | Role | Notes | Source |
|---|---|---|---|---|
| 1996 | Twilight Syndrome: Search | Mika Kishii 岸井ミカ | PS1 / PS2 | |
| 1996 | Twilight Syndrome Explorations | Mika Kishii 岸井ミカ | PS1 / PS2 | |
| 1996 | Fire Woman Maitogumi ja:ファイアーウーマン纏組 | Madoka Nittou | | |
| 1997 | Cat the Ripper: 13-ninme no Tanteishi | | PlayStation, Sega Saturn | |
| 1998 | Let's go on a tour party graduation trip ツアーパーティー 卒業旅行にいこう | Kirishima Yoshinori 霧島佳澄 | PlayStation, Sega Saturn | |
| 1998 | Firewoman wear pair ja:ファイアーウーマン纏組 | Madoka Shindo 新藤まどか | PS1 / PS2 | |
| 1998 | Tokyo 23 ward uniform WARS 東京23区制服WARS | Kannazuki Koya 神無月小夜 | PS1 / PS2 | |
| 1998 | First Kiss Story | Yu Fujisawa | PC-FX | |
| 1998 | Rival Schools: United by Fate | Hinata Wakaba | PS1 / PS2 | |
| 1998 | Lady Express ja:お嬢様特急 | Satomi Chitose | PlayStation, Sega Saturn | |
| 1998 | Yuwaku Office Love Affairs Section ja:ゆうわくオフィス恋愛課 | Kasumi Kirishima | PlayStation | |
| 1988 | At the wind hill park 風の丘公園にて | Deep snow Kawana 川奈深雪 | PS1 / PS2 | |
| 1998 | Snow-breaking flowers ja:雪割りの花 | Child | PS1 / PS2 | |
| 1998 | New Generation Robot Senki Brave Saga ja:新世代ロボット戦記 ブレイブサーガ | Serizawa Shunsaru 芹沢瞬兵 | PS1 / PS2 | |
| 1999 | Fire Guilty Phrase ~ Koibito ~ ja:火魅子伝 ～恋解～ | Horses 兎音 | PS1 / PS2 | |
| 1999 | Sengoku Bishojo Picture Scrolls Sky! ! ~ The chapter of the spring breeze ~ 戦国美少女絵巻 空を斬る！！ ～春風の章～ | Izumi Shirasagi, Yui | PC | |
| 1999 | Shiritsu Justice Gakuen: Nekketsu Seisyun Nikki 2 | Hinata Wakaba | Arcade, PlayStation | |
| 1999 | Persona 2: Innocent Sin | Yukino Mayuzumi | PS1 / PS2 | |
| 2000 | Summon Night | Cassis カシス | PS1 / PS2 パートナー。召喚師 | |
| 2000 | To meet you ~ ... your smiles in my heart ~ ja:あいたくて... 〜your smiles in my heart〜 | Hibiki Aihara 藍原ひびき | PlayStation | |
| 2000 | Brave Saga 2 | Serizawa Shunsaru 芹沢瞬兵 | PS1 / PS2 | |
| 2000 | Blue Submarine No. 6: Antarctica | Mutio (older sister) ミューティオ（姉） | PS1 / PS2 | |
| 2000 | Project Justice | Wakaba Hinata 若葉ひなた | DC | |
| 2001 | Macross M3 | Moaramia Jenius | DC | |
| 2001 | Armored Core 2: Another Age | Navus Concord client ナーヴスコンコードクライアント | PS1 / PS2 | |
| 2001 | Summon Night 2 | Natsumi, Cassis cell bolt ナツミ, カシス・セルボルト | PS1 / PS2 誓約者。前作主人公 | |
| 2001 | Flame Our Lady - The Virgin on Megiddo ~ 火焔聖母 ～The Virgin on Megiddo～ | Moriguchi Shino 森口紫乃 | DC | |
| 2002 | PoPoLoCRoIS: Adventure of Beginnings | Luna | PS1 / PS2 | |
| 2002 | Brave Knight - Leeveland Hero Transfer ~ ブレイブナイト ～リーヴェラント英雄伝～ | Miria Rainas ミリア=レイナス | Other | |
| 2003 | Disgaea: Hour of Darkness | Etna | PS2 | |
| 2003 | Star Ocean Till the End of Time | Welch Vineyard, Farin ウェルチ・ビンヤード/ファリン | PS1 / PS2 | |
| 2003 | Marl Jong | Etna | | |
| 2003 | Sunrise World War From Sunrise Heroes サンライズワールドウォー From サンライズ英雄譚 | Uruagi life 卯都木命 | PS1 / PS2 | |
| 2004 | PoPoLoCRoIS: Adventure of the Law of the Moon | Luna | PS1 / PS2 | |
| 2005 | Radiata Stories | Air Dale エアデ—ル | PS1 / PS2 主人公の姉 | |
| 2005 | New Century Brave Wars | Uruagi life 卯都木命 | PS1 / PS2 | |
| 2005 | Makai Kingdom: Chronicles of the Sacred Tome | Etna | PS1 / PS2 | |
| 2005 | Elemental Gelade - Completed, Sui style sword - エレメンタルジェレイド-纏え、翠風の剣- | Philo (Fearsup = Eclirol) フィロ（フィアズーフ=エクリロール） | PS1 / PS2 | |
| 2005 | Rogue Galaxy | MIO / Marg Pocaccio / Lion King; MIO/マーグ・ポカッチョ/獅子王 | PS1 / PS2 | |
| 2006 | Disgaea 2 | Evil Genie 魔神エトナ | PS1 / PS2 | |
| 2007 | Eternal Sonata | Falsetto | Xbox 360 | |
| 2007 | Star Ocean: First Departure | Welch Vineyard | PSP | |
| 2008 | Disgaea 3: Absence of Justice | Etna | PS3 | |
| 2008 | Super Smash Bros. Brawl | Pokémon Trainer | Wii | |
| 2008 | Star Ocean: Second Evolution | Welch Vineyard | PSP | |
| 2008 | Trusty Bell: Chopin's Dream – Reprise | Falsetto ファルセット | PS3 | |
| 2008 | Prinny: Can I Really Be the Hero? | Etna | PSP | |
| 2009 | Disgaea Infinite | Etna | PSP | |
| 2010 | Z.H.P. Unlosing Ranger VS Darkdeath Evilman | Etna | PSP | |
| 2010 | Prinny 2 | Etna | PSP | |
| 2011 | Disgaea 4 | Erona エロナ | PS3 | |
| 2012 | Time Travelers | Mikoto (elementary school student) | DS, PSP | |
| 2013 | Disgaea D2: A Brighter Darkness | Etna | PS3 | |
| 2013 | Super Robot Wars Operation Extend | Badrinath · Halchando バドリナート・ハルチャンド | PSP | |
| 2016 | Summon Night 6 | Natsumi Hashimoto | | |
| 2016 | Star Ocean: Integrity and Faithlessness | Welch Vineyard | PS3 | |
| 2018 | Super Smash Bros. Ultimate | Male Pokémon Trainer | Nintendo Switch | |
| | Heroine Dream 2 ja:ヒロインドリーム2 | Himitsune 御前静 | PS1 / PS2 | |
| | Capcom vs. SNK 2 EO | Hinata Wakaba | | |
| | Phantom Brave | Etna | PS2 | |
| | Phantom Kingdom | Etna | PS2 | |
| | Purikura Daisakusen | Kirara | Sega Saturn | |
| | Shinsuku Taisen It's a Noni! | Neruru, Juice, Narrator | PlayStation | |
| | Sister Princess | Yotsuba | | |
| | Crisis Beat ja:クライシス ビ—ト | Yan Haint Feisu | | |

==== Unknown date ====
- Etna in Disgaea 2: Cursed Memories, Cross Edge, Phantom Brave
- Welch Vineyard in Star Ocean
- Haruka in Ape Escape: Pumped & Primed and Ape Escape Million Monkeys
- Shunpei Serizawa in The Saint of Braves Baan Gaan (Brave Saga)
- Rachel in Trapt
- Velma Dinkley in Lego Dimensions

=== Other voice recordings ===
List of voice performances in drama CDs and radio
| Year | Title | Role | Notes | Source |
|---|---|---|---|---|
| 2002 | Weather spirits ja:気象精霊記 | Milli · Oreano · Yakumo ミリィ・オレアノ・ヤクモ | Drama CD | |
| 2004 | Spirit ring スピリット・リング | Yulia / cobolt ユリア/コボルト | Radio | |
| | Yuushaou Gaogaigar | Mikoto Utsugi | Drama CD | |
| | First Kiss Story | Yu Fujisawa | Drama CD | |
| | Megami Ibunroku Persona | Yukino | Drama CD | |

=== Dubbing ===
List of voice performances in overseas dubbing
| Year | Title | Role | Notes | Source |
|---|---|---|---|---|
| 2004 | School of Rock | Billy "Fancy Pants" | Voice dub for Brian Falduto | |
| 2008 | The Big White | Tiffany | Voice dub for Alison Lohman | |
| 2008 | December Boys | Spark | Voice dub for Christian Byers | |
| 2012 | Adventure Time | Fiona | | |
| 2018 | The Epic Tales of Captain Underpants | George Beard | | |
| | As Told By Ginger | Ginger | | |
| | Kung Fu Panda | Rabbit boy | | |
| | Peppa Pig | Susie Sheep | | |
| | Franny's Feet | Luna | | |
| | Scooby-Doo franchise | Velma Dinkley | | |
| | Medium | Brigitte | season 3 | |
| | Dollhouse | Iris | | |
| | The Twins Effect | Gillian Chung | | |
| | 8 Simple Rules | Mr. Jenna | | |
| | Victorious | Trina Vega | | |
| | iCarly | Nevel | | |
| | Veronica's Closet | Chloe | | |
| | Spring Waltz | Kang | | |
| | Miss Potter | Beatrix girl | | |
| | Four Minutes | Clara | | |
| | The Mummy Returns | Alex | | |
| | A Battle of Wits | Xiao Xiao's older sister | | |
