= Saru! Get You! SaruSaru Big Mission =

2007 platform video game

- Developer: h.a.n.d. (Note: Japan Studio assisted on development.)
- Publisher: Sony Computer Entertainment
- Composer: Soichi Terada
- Series: Ape Escape
- Platform: PlayStation Portable
- Release: JP: July 26, 2007
- Genre: Platform
- Mode: Single-player

Saru! Get You! SaruSaru Big Mission (Note: Japanese: サルゲッチュ サルサル大作戦, Hepburn: Sarugetchu: Saru Saru Daisakusen) is a 2007 platform video game developed by h.a.n.d. and published by Sony Computer Entertainment for the PlayStation Portable. A spin-off of the Ape Escape series, it was released only in Japan.

== Plot ==
After kidnapping The Professor, Aki, Sayaka, Satoru and Hikaru, Specter goes on to shrink the laboratory with Kakeru and Natsumi still inside. However, the lab is now the perfect size to be disguised as a Pipo Helmet - Natsumi and Kakeru use this to take control over monkeys (or Piposaru in Japan) to help rescue their friends and defeat Specter once again.

== Gameplay ==
Unlike other stand-alone titles in the series such as Pipo Saru 2001 and Ape Escape: Pumped & Primed, the game borrows heavily from Ape Escape 3. The same graphic engine is used, which is a first for Ape Escape, as usually all games' graphics are re-created for each game.

In a different approach to the normal gameplay, SaruSaru Big Mission has the player controlling the Pipo Helmet shaped lab. By latching it onto a monkey, they can gain control of it, including any abilities it may have. If the monkey takes too much damage, they will lose control of it. The aim is to utilize the monkeys' abilities to reach the end of the level safely.
