= Yokota =

Yokota (Japanese: 横田, 與古田, etc.) may refer to:

- 6656 Yokota, an asteroid
- Yokota Shōkai, a Japanese film company

== Places ==
- Yokota Air Base, a US Air Force Base located in Tokyo, Japan
- Harima-Yokota Station
- Iyo-Yokota Station
- Yokota, Shimane
  - Izumo Yokota Station
- Iwami-Yokota Station

== People with the surname ==
- Yokota family (born 1930s)
- Jaguar Yokota (born 1961), professional wrestler
- Jun'ya Yokota (1945–2019), science fiction writer and cultural historian
- Katsumi Yokota, video game designer
- Kazuyoshi Yokota (?–2011), anime director
- Kiko Yokota (横田 葵子; born 1997), Japanese rhythmic gymnast
- Mahito Yokota, video game composer
- Mamoru Yokota, anime illustrator
- Masato Yokota (born 1987), athlete
- Megumi Yokota (born 1964), Japanese national abducted by North Korea
- Misao Yokota (born 1917), freestyle swimmer
- Sachiko Yokota (横田 幸子), Japanese table tennis player
- Shigeaki Yokota (born 1969), professional Go player
- Shinichiro Yokota (横田 信一郎), Japanese house music producer
- Susumu Yokota (?–2015), composer
- Tadayoshi Yokota (1947–2023), volleyball player
- Takatoshi Yokota (1487–1550), samurai
- Toshifumi Yokota, Japanese medical scientist and professor of medical genetics
- Yoshimi P-We (Yoshimi Yokota, born 1968), musician
- Yozo Yokota (1940–2019), Japanese law professor
