= Soichi Terada =

Japanese electronic music composer (born 1965)

Soichi Terada 寺田 創一
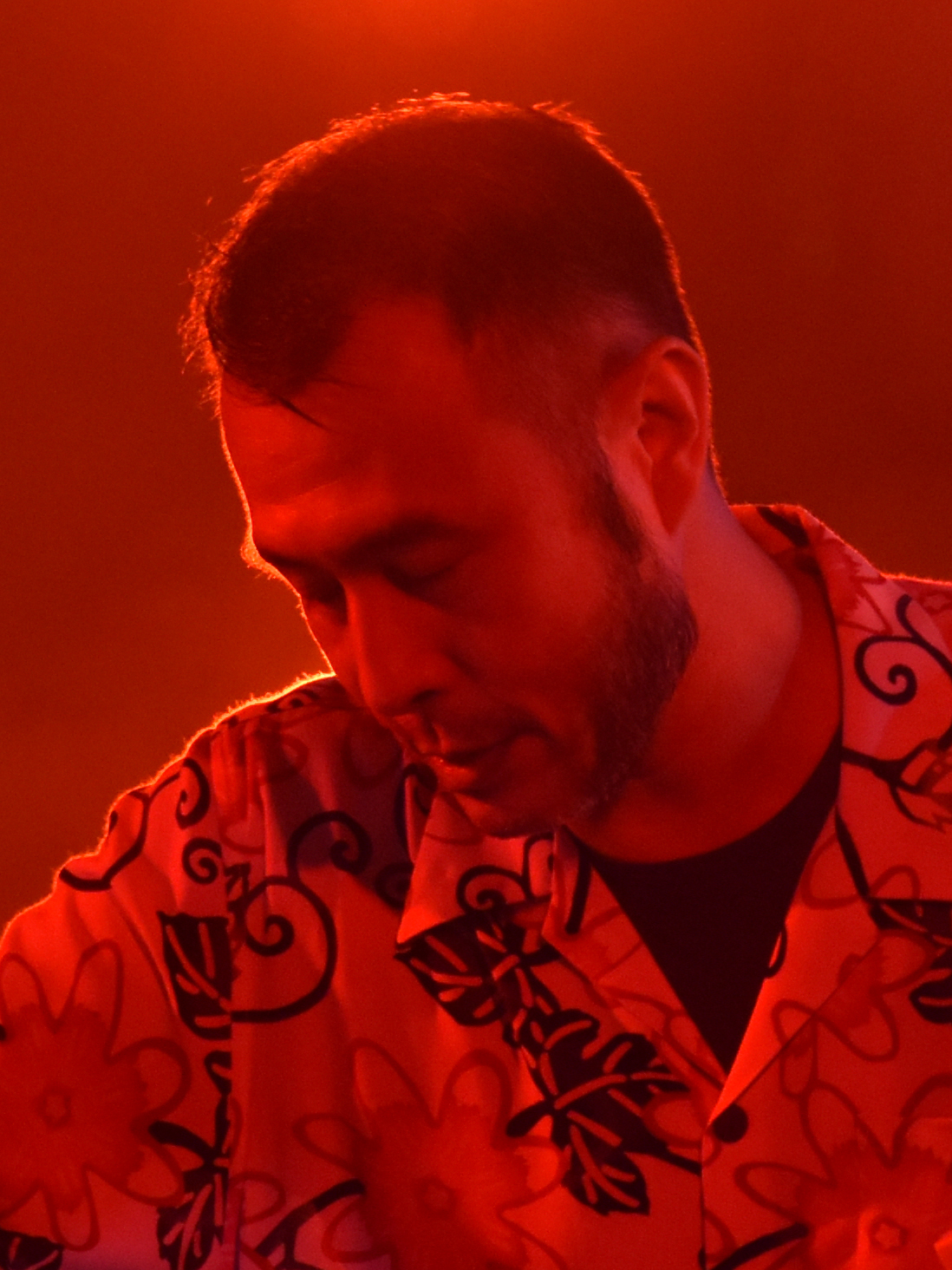
- Terada in 2022

Background information
- Also known as: Omodaka, TRD-01
- Born: March 19, 1965 (age 61); Tokyo, Japan
- Genres: House, drum and bass, jungle, chiptune
- Occupations: Composer, arranger, remixer
- Instrument: Electronic organ
- Years active: 1989–present
- Label: Far East Recording
- Website: http://www.fareastrecording.com/mt/

Japanese name
- Kanji: 寺田 創一
- Hiragana: てらだ そういち
Transcriptions
- Romanization: Terada Sōichi

Soichi Terada (Japanese: 寺田 創一, Hepburn: Terada Sōichi; born March 19, 1965) is a Japanese electronic music composer, best known for his work in the Ape Escape video game series. He started producing music in 1989 as well as remixing singers such as Nami Shimada. He and fellow producer Shinichiro Yokota formed Far East Recording in 1990, releasing various albums and singles. After releasing the album Sumo Jungle in 1996, he composed the soundtrack for Ape Escape in 1999.

In 2014, "The Far East Transcripts" EP was released, sparking interest in Terada's work. A year after, the album Sounds from the Far East was released, which led to him touring and creating more music.

== Biography ==
=== Early life and career ===
Terada was born on March 19, 1965, in Tokyo, Japan, playing the electronic organ when he was younger. He majored in computer science and electronic organ at the University of Electro-Communications. In 1987, he traveled to New York City as a part of a three-piece band and "fell in love with the city and its distinctive sound." When he returned to Tokyo, he started producing house music and trying to emulate the city's style, sending demos to labels like Sleeping Bag Records but with no avail. That same year, Terada met Shinichiro Yokota at a Vestax DJ Contest, where Terada introduced Yokota to house music synthesizers and letting him use his instruments.

In 1989, he produced the song "Sun Shower" for singer Nami Shimada, which was remixed by Larry Levan and Mark Kamins. A year after, he and Yokota formed the label Far East Recording after Terada graduated university, releasing their first album called Far East Recording in 1992.

In 1997, he composed for the Japanese drama Psychometrer Eiji alongside Chuei Yoshikawa and DJ Krush.

=== Video games and Omodaka ===
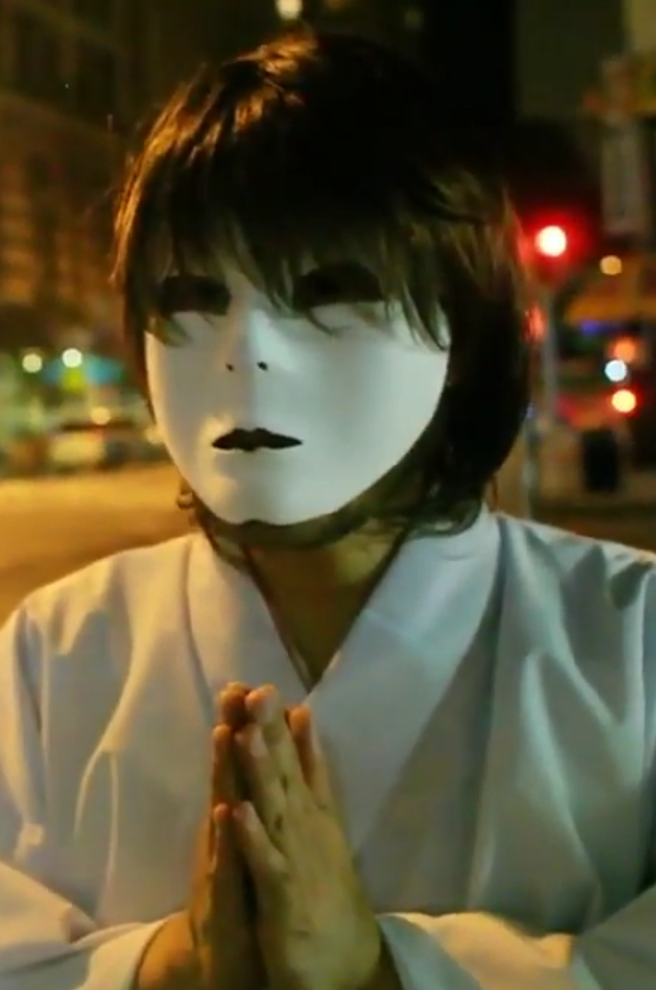
Terada in costume for the Omodaka project.

Terada started composing soundtracks for video games in 1998, with his first for Wangan Trial.

In 1999, Terada was given an opportunity to compose the music for Ape Escape after a game director listened to his track "Sumo Jungle." When he learned what the game was about, Terada was "really excited" as he played on the PlayStation and was shown demo footage of the game. A year after, he composed for the Japanese version of the PlayStation 2 game Fantavision.

In 2001, he created the project Omodaka while trying to create a "boat racing song." He released the first album, Cantata No. 147, under the project in 2006. Japanese folk singer Akiko Kanazawa joined the project as the genre transitioned to folktronica in 2009. That same year, he donned a white mask and a Miko outfit. Under the project, Terada writes about the prostitution during the Edo period and gambling in Japan and starts with a backing tracks first instead of lyrics.

=== Resurgence ===
In 2014, London-based Japanese label Hhatri released The Far East Transcripts, an EP which included three of Yokota's tracks and one of Terada's tracks. The EP sparked renewed interest in Japanese house music, especially Yokota and Terada's works. In 2015, Dutch label Rush Hour reached out to Terada if he wanted to release a compilation album of his work, to which he agreed. They released a compilation album called Sounds from the Far East, which was compiled by German-born Korean DJ Hunee.

The album's release led to Terada producing more music and going on tours, including Europe and North America for the first time in 2016. In 2017, he toured with Nick Dwyer of Weird Together in India, which was hosted by the Red Bull Music Academy.

== Artistry ==
=== Influences ===
Terada is influenced by house and hip hop, as well as bands such as RC Succession, Akiko Yano and Yellow Magic Orchestra. He has since moved away from hip-hop to more sample-based and digital production. He is also influenced by foreign people, such as English singer Sheila Chandra.

=== Musical style ===
Terada's musical style focuses on house music and jungle. In an interview with Vice, he revealed that he uses the stereotypes of Asia when running the Far East Label, with Terada also saying that he is happy when someone tells him that he combines "Asian elements" with house music.

As Omodaka, he is influenced by YMCK, traditional Japanese music, and retro game sounds. He uses consoles such as the Game Boy, Nintendo DS, PSP, and Korg Kaossilator.

== Discography ==
=== Albums ===
==== As Soichi Terada ====
Year	Title	Label
1992	Far East Recording	Far East Recording
1992	Unity	Far East Recording
1992	Urban Rhythm Solutions	Far East Recording
1993	Far East Recording 2	Far East Recording
1994	Smoky	Far East Recording
1995	Sumo Jungle	Far East Recording
1995	Sumo Jungle 2	Far East Recording
1996	Sumo Jungle Grandeur	Far East Recording
1997	Psychometrer Eiji Soundtrack	Sony Music
1997	Satsujin No Jikou Ha 15Nen	Far East Recording
1998	Acid Face	Far East Recording
2000	Kimigayo	Far East Recording
2000	Don't Panic Seaman	Far East Recording
2004	Gacha Mecha Stadium Saru Bato~re Sarundtracks!!	Far East Recording
2011	Ape Escape Originape Soundtracks	Far East Recording
2012	Ape Escape 3 Originape Soundtracks	Far East Recording
2015	Sounds from the Far East	Far East Recording
2022	Asakusa Light	Rush Hour

==== As Omodaka ====
Year	Title	Label
2006	Cantata No. 147	Far East Recording
2014	Bridge Song	Far East Recording
2019	Gujoh Bushi	Far East Recording

==== As Far East Recording ====
Year	Title	Label
1999	Yokoi-San	Far East Recording

== Games ==
Year	Title	Role(s)
1996	Tomomi Tsunoda: Come and Kiss Me	Producer
1997	Arc the Lad: Monster Game with Casino Game	Remixer
1997	Ultra Resort Keroncuel	Sound designer
1998	Wangan Trial	Composer
1999	Ape Escape	Composer
2000	Fantavision (Japanese version)	Composer
2001	Super Galdelic Hour	Musician
2001	beatmania THE SOUND OF TOKYO!	Programmer
2001	Space Fishermen	Composer
2002	Futari no Fantavision	Composer
2004	Ape Escape: Pumped & Primed	Composer
2004	EyeToy: Monkey Mania	Composer
2005	Ape Escape: On the Loose	Composer
2005	Ape Escape 3	Composer
2006	Saru! Get You! Million Monkeys	Composer
2007	Saru! Get You! SaruSaru Big Mission	Composer
2020	Namco Museum Archives Vol. 1	Sound designer
2023	Fantavision 202X	Composer
