= Shin'ichirō =

- Gender: Male

Origin
- Origin: Japanese
- Meaning: Different meanings depending on the kanji used

Shin'ichirō, Shin'ichiro, Shin'ichirou or Shin'ichiroh (written: 信一郎, 真一郎, 眞一郎, 晋一郎, 伸一郎, 振一郎 or 慎一郎) is a masculine Japanese given name. Notable people with the name include:

- Shinichiro Furumoto (古本 伸一郎; born 1965), Japanese politician
- Shin'ichirō Ikebe (池辺 晋一郎; born 1943), Japanese composer
- Shin'ichirō Hattori (服部 慎一郎; born 1999), Japanese professional shogi player
- Shinichiro Kawabata (川畑 伸一郎; born 1966), Japanese baseball player
- Shinichiro Kimura (木村 真一郎), Japanese anime director
- Shinichiro Kobayashi (小林 伸一郎; born 1956), Japanese photographer
- Shinichiro Koyama (小山 伸一郎; born 1978), Japanese baseball player
- Shinichiro Kurimoto (栗本 慎一郎; born 1941), Japanese anthropologist, philosopher, writer and politician
- Shin'ichirō Kurino (栗野 慎一郎; 1851–1937), Japanese diplomat
- Shinichiro Kuwada (桒田 慎一朗; born 1986), Japanese footballer
- Shin-ichiro Miki (三木 眞一郎; born 1968), Japanese voice actor
- Nakamura Shinichiro (中村 真一郎; 1918–1997), Japanese writer
- Shinichiro Ohta (太田 真一郎; born 1971), Japanese voice actor and announcer
- Shinichiro Sakurai (桜井 眞一郎; 1929–2011), Japanese automotive engineer
- Shinichirō Sawai (澤井 信一郎; born 1938), Japanese film director and screenwriter
- Shinichiro Suzuki (鈴木 信一朗; born 1934), Japanese boxer
- Shinichiro Takahashi (高橋 真一郎; born 1957), Japanese footballer and manager
- Shinichiro Tani (谷 真一郎; born 1968), Japanese footballer
- Sin-Itiro Tomonaga (朝永 振一郎; 1906–1979), Japanese physicist
- Shinichirō Watanabe (渡辺 信一郎; born 1965), Japanese anime director, screenwriter and producer
- Shinichiro Yokota (横田 信一郎; born 1969), Japanese DJ and record producer
