= Saru Get You -On Air- =

Japanese anime television series

- Ape Escape -On Air-

サルゲッチュ 〜オンエアー〜 (Saru Getchu -On Eā-)
- Genre: Adventure, fantasy, comedy, romance
- Created by: Sony Computer Entertainment
- Anime television series
- Directed by: Nobuyoshi Habara
- Written by: Naruhisa Arakawa
- Music by: Youichi Sakai
- Studio: Xebec
- Original network: TV Tokyo
- Original run: April 8, 2006 – October 1, 2006
- Episodes: 26
- Anime television series

Ape Escape -On Air- 2nd
- Directed by: Jun Kamiya
- Written by: Naruhisa Arakawa
- Music by: Youichi Sakai
- Studio: Xebec
- Original network: TV Tokyo
- Original run: October 7, 2006 – September 29, 2007
- Episodes: 51

Ape Escape -On Air- (サルゲッチュ 〜オンエアー〜, Saru Getchu -On Eā-) is a CGI anime television series produced by Xebec based on Sony's Ape Escape video game franchise. The series and its sequel (Ape Escape -On Air- 2nd) aired on TV Tokyo between April 8, 2006, and September 29, 2007, and loosely adapt storylines from Million Monkeys, Ape Escape 3, and SaruSaru Big Mission.

== Storyline ==
When Specter gets ahold of a Pipo Helmet, he becomes intelligent and starts using monkeys to spread chaos around the world. Using their teleporter and gadgets, Kakeru, Hiroki, Natsumi, and the Professor work to capture the monkeys and stop Specter's plans. Spike and friends are later joined by virtual girl, Charu, and mech genius, Haruka. It is eventually revealed that Specter's true identity is Natsumi's pet monkey, Kuuta, who was transformed into Specter by a group called the Pipotrons. The Pipotrons host a game in virtual space, challenging Kakeru and his friends for Specter's freedom, but Specter escapes before they get there. The Pipotrons then challenge Kakeru and co. to a tournament. Specter eventually learned about the kind things humans have done for monkeys, protects Kakeru, and returns to being Kuuta.

== Cast ==
- Shizuka Ishikawa as Kakeru
- Chika Sakamoto as Specter/Kuuta
- Hideyuki Umezu as Hakase
- Junko Minagawa as Hiroki
- Tomoko Kawakami as Natsumi
- Tomoe Hanba as Haruka
- Rina Satou as Charu
- Junko Takeuchi as Satoru
- Ai Nonaka as Sayaka
- Sayaka Ohara as Akie
