= Alvion =

Japanese video game developer

Alvion Co., Ltd. 株式会社アルヴィオン
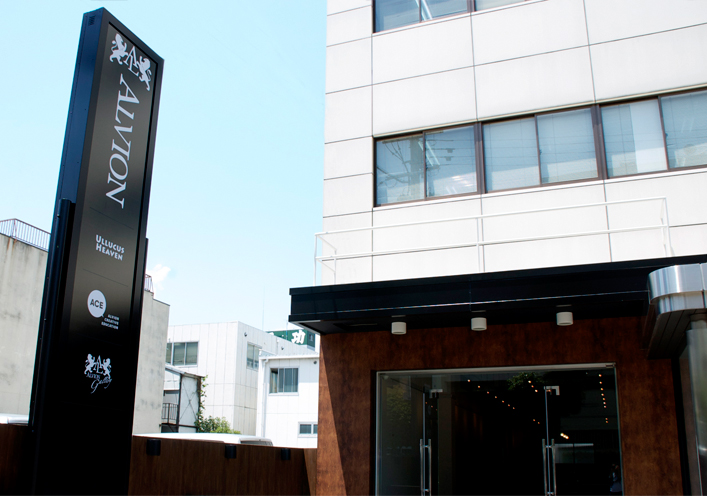
- Alvion's headquarters in 2015.
- Company type: Ltd.
- Industry: Software & programming
- Founded: November 1996
- Headquarters: Suita, Osaka Prefecture, Japan
- Subsidiaries: Ullucus Ltd.
- Website: www.alvion.co.jp

Alvion Co., Ltd. (株式会社アルヴィオン, Kabushiki-gaisha Aruvion) is a Japanese video game developer and publishing company. Alvion Group ( Alvion & ULLUCUS HEAVEN ) Alvion is an APP and publishing company.

== History ==
Alvion was founded in November 1996. In 1998, headquarters were founded in Suita, Osaka. A career preparation school, ACE, in 2004. In 2005, Alvion founded Ullucus Ltd. In 2006, the company relocated their headquarters and renamed as Alvion Co., Ltd.

== Games developed ==
=== PlayStation ===
- Circadia (1999)

=== PlayStation 2 ===
- ChainDive (2003)
- Poinie's Poin (2002)

=== PlayStation Portable ===
- The Dog: Happy Life (2006)

=== PlayStation 3 ===
- Malicious (2010)

=== PlayStation Vita ===
- Malicious Rebirth (2012)

=== PlayStation 4 ===
- Malicious Fallen (2017)

=== Nintendo DS ===
- Poupée Girl DS (2009)
- Poupée Girl DS2 (2010)

=== Mobile phones ===
- Dragon Tactics (iOS, Android)
- Fragment's Note (iOS, Android, PlayStation Mobile)
- Fragment's Note2 Side: Shizuku (iOS, Android)
- Fragment's Note2 Side: Yukitsuki (iOS, Android)
- Fragment's Note2 Side: Yukitsuki Series third installment (PlayStation Mobile)
- Fragment's Note Memories -Fragment's Note- (iOS, Android, PlayStation Mobile)

=== Development support ===
- Anarchy Reigns (PlayStation 3 & Xbox 360, for PlatinumGames)
- Ape Escape Academy (PlayStation Portable, for Sony Computer Entertainment)
- Ape Escape Academy 2 (PlayStation Portable, for Sony Computer Entertainment)
- Ape Escape: On the Loose (PlayStation Portable, for Sony Computer Entertainment)
- Ape Quest (PlayStation Portable, for Sony Computer Entertainment)
- Bayonetta (PlayStation 3 & Xbox 360, for PlatinumGames)
- Bayonetta 2 (Wii U, for PlatinumGames)
- Fire Emblem: Shadow Dragon (Nintendo DS, for Nintendo and Intelligent Systems)
- Infinite Space (Nintendo DS, for PlatinumGames and Nude Maker)
- The King of Fighters Orochi Hen (PlayStation 2, for SNK Playmore)
- MadWorld (Wii, for PlatinumGames)
- Metal Gear Rising: Revengeance (PlayStation 3 & Xbox 360, for PlatinumGames and Kojima Productions)
- Siren 2 (PlayStation 2, for Sony Computer Entertainment and Project Siren)
- Siren: Blood Curse (PlayStation 3, for Sony Computer Entertainment and Project Siren)
- The Wonderful 101 (Wii U, for PlatinumGames)
- Paper Mario Color Splash (Wii U, for Nintendo and Intelligent Systems)
- Splatoon 2: Octo Expansion (Nintendo Switch, for Nintendo)
