= Pipo Saru 2001 =

2001 video game

- Developer(s): Sony Computer Entertainment Japan
- Publisher(s): Sony Computer Entertainment
- Series: Ape Escape
- Platform(s): PlayStation 2
- Release: JP: July 5, 2001
- Genre(s): Action
- Mode(s): Single-player

Pipo Saru 2001 (ピポサル2001, Pipo Saru Ni-sen Ichi) is a 2001 action video game developed and published by Sony Computer Entertainment for the PlayStation 2. A spin-off and the second game in the Ape Escape series, it was released only in Japan; a true sequel, Ape Escape 2, was released internationally for the PlayStation 2 in 2002.

== Gameplay ==
Piposaru 2001's gameplay differs from the original Ape Escape gameplay outline. The left analog stick on the DualShock controller is used to control Spike's movement, but unlike the original game, the right analog stick was unused and the Face buttons were used to attack. The goal of each level is to use a vacuum cleaner to remove a required amount of pants off of the apes and put them into an oversized washing machine, while preventing the monkeys from re-obtaining their shorts or attacking the player. While sucking the pants off a monkey, the monkey can be fired into other monkeys to knock them out. Bomb tokens can also be collected to attack monkeys and bosses. The graphics were slightly improved yet very similar to the original game, with the same symbols throughout the game (such as the stage cleared symbol).

It has 36 stages while the original had only 19. Each level is timed. There are five stages to complete, with a boss battle in each level.

== Plot ==
Specter has made all the monkeys' pants dirty and Spike/Kakeru has to wash them.

== Release ==
Sony Computer Entertainment revealed that a Ape Escape sequel was in development in August 2000. An assortment of toys were released concurrently with the game. A demo was released through McDonald's named the "Happy Disc". The levels were slightly altered to contain McDonald's logos, fries and burgers.

== Reception ==
In a June 2001 preview GameSpot said: "The game may not be visually outstanding, and it plays somewhat differently from the original, but it is still fun." In a July 2001 preview GameSpot wrote: "[...] Ape Escape's charm and wit have remained intact in this title." In a June 2001 preview IGN noted the game as "something completely new" and they had high hopes for it. In another preview in June, IGN said the game is like a faster paced Luigi's Mansion and concluded: "Don't expect a technical work-horse for the PS2, but the graphics get the job done just fine, and the fast play helps to keep the interest level up."

On release, Famitsu magazine scored the game a 31 out of 40.
