= Poupéegirl =

Japanese social networking website

- Website type: Social networking
- Available in: Japanese; English
- Founded: March 3, 2008; 18 years ago
- Dissolved: March 31, 2015
- Headquarters: Shibuya, Tokyo, Japan
- CEO: Yoshimi Morinaga
- Parent: CyberAgent
- Website: pupe.ameba.jp at the Wayback Machine (archived September 1, 2012)
- Commercial: Yes
- Registration: Optional (required for most services)
- Users: 560,000
- Launched: February 28, 2007; 19 years ago
- Current status: Defunct

Poupéegirl (プーペガール, Pūpegāru; stylized as poupéegirl) was a Japanese avatar and fashion community where users upload photos of their clothes and earn website currency to dress up their avatars. Created by CyberAgent, Poupéegirl was first launched on February 28, 2007, and relocated to Ameba in 2009. Poupéegirl ended updates for the website on August 31, 2013, before finally closing on March 31, 2015.

During the years when Poupéegirl was active, the website had over 560,000 users in 2009. In addition to their website services, they released a line of licensed video games for the Nintendo DS, all published by Alvion, as well as a Facebook game.

== History ==
On February 28, 2007, the website was launched and was initially managed by CyberAgent. However, on March 3, 2008, Poupéegirl Inc. was officially established and extended services to mobile phones. In 2009, the website moved to Ameba.

Poupéegirl briefly launched a Facebook application titled "Poupée Boutique" on July 21, 2010, which was then closed on November 18, 2010, due to administrative reasons.

On July 5, 2013, Poupéegirl announced that the website will terminate some of its gameplay features starting on August 31, 2013. This included closing registration to new users, putting an end to releases on new items, and shutting down the pay-to-play jewels and friend invitation systems. On February 27, 2015, Poupéegirl announced that they would officially be closing the website on March 31, 2015.

== Gameplay ==
The currency of the game was "ribbons", which could be earned by completing various tasks, including posting fashion items, logging in, dressing up avatars, and commenting on other users' photos. Those ribbons could be used to buy clothing for avatars. Users could also randomly obtain shells to exchange for dress-up items.

In 2009, the website implemented a new currency, "jewels", a pay-to-play system where some users were able to access clothing items for their avatar that non-paying users could not. Jewel clothing items could be purchased exclusively with jewels during events or by bidding competitively for them at the Jewel Auction.

=== Closet ===
Users could post photos of actual clothing and accessories which other users of the website could view and comment on as well as create their own virtual closet. Fashion items could be categorized according to brand name (listed under the brand name in the Fashion Dictionary) and type. Every item had a yellow "Suteki" (or "Cute") button. If a user got many suteki rankings or comments, they were eligible to win ribbons.

=== Avatar ===
Each user had a customizable avatar, which they could dress up with clothing and accessories. The avatar, designed by Maminoir, was detailed to make it appeal to female users. Dressing up daily led to earning more ribbons, with each daily dress-up recorded in a calendar on the user's profile. During events, the background of the avatar would change from a normal room. Occasionally, the website had a contest with a selected theme for the best dressed avatar, which led to a ribbon prize and a new item.

Poupéegirl had a marketplace where users could buy or sell their avatar's clothing. The website's mascot, Katharine, owned a shop that regularly sold clothing pertaining to seasonal styles or monthly events. Poupéegirl also endorsed collaborations or campaigns with brand names and celebrities, allowing users to buy items for their avatar specially designed by them or based on real-life products. These included Coach, Kosé's Happy Bath Day Precious Rose line, Shiseido, Sanrio, Reebok, Louis Vuitton, Maybelline, Revlon, Kaela Kimura, Aya Hirayama, and Nozomi Tsuji.

== Reception ==
As of 2009, there were about 560,000 registered users, with 98% being women and 35% living outside Japan. Many Japanese fashion brands appreciated its capability of promoting fashion goods through the website.

== Merchandise ==
On December 17, 2009, a video game was released for Poupéegirl on the Nintendo DS and was published by Alvion, titled Poupéegirl DS (プーペガールDS, Pūpegāru DS). A second video game was released on December 16, 2010, in two versions: Poupéegirl DS 2: Sweet Pink Style (プーペガールDS2~スウィートピンクスタイル~, Pūpegāru DS 2 ~Suīto Pinku Sutairu~) and Poupéegirl DS 2: Elegant Mint Style (プーペガールDS2~エレガントミントスタイル~, Pūpegāru DS 2 ~Ereganto Minto Sutairu~). Completing certain objectives in all games allowed users to obtain secret codes that would unlock exclusive dress-up items for the avatars on the main website.
