= Ape Academy 2 =

2005 video game

- European box art
- Developers: Shift; Alvion (Note: Additional work by Sony Computer Entertainment Japan.)
- Publisher: Sony Computer Entertainment
- Series: Ape Escape
- Platform: PlayStation Portable
- Release: JP: December 15, 2005; EU: September 29, 2006; AU: October 19, 2006
- Genre: Party
- Modes: Single-player, multiplayer

Ape Academy 2, also known as Piposaru Academia 2: Aiai Sarugē Janken Battle! (Note: Japanese: ピポザルアカデミ〜ア2 あいあいサルゲ〜 ジャンケンバトル!, Hepburn: Piposaru Akademi〜a 2 Aiai Sarugē Janken Batoru!) in Japan, is a 2005 party video game developed by Shift and Alvion and published by Sony Computer Entertainment for the PlayStation Portable. It is the sequel to Ape Escape Academy.

Similar to its predecessor, Ape Academy 2 is a collection of mini-games which can either be played in single-player or multiplayer mode. Most of the mini-games borrow from elements of Ape Escape 3.

The original PlayStation Portable version of the game was released in Japan, Europe and Australia, but not North America. It was re-released worldwide as a PSP classic for PlayStation 4 and PlayStation 5 in March 2023, marking the first time the game came out in North American territories.

== Plot ==
The primary antagonist, Specter, introduces a new card game which becomes very popular among humans and pipo monkeys alike. Using this card game, he dominates the world through culture manipulation, concurrently introducing a card battle contest for monkeys to complete in. The prize for winning the contest is the rare "Platinum Specter" trading card and a year's supply of bananas.

== Gameplay ==
The single-player mode is radically different from previous games in the series, most resembling a trading card game. The player travels to various levels, in the form of islands, to compete against other monkeys in an assortment of minigames. After a set number of victories, the player can then compete against a boss character. This cycle is repeated for each island visited, in increasing difficulty. Occasionally, the player will encounter unexpected battles. These challenges cannot be declined. The objective of the game is to collect cards and coins, eventually to the point that the player can attempt to defeat the antagonist and win. There is also a multiplayer component which includes a "monkey-shield" that ensures the second player cannot see the player 1 cards. This mode requires a second PSP and game cartridge.

== Reception ==
Reception

Aggregate score
Aggregator	Score
Metacritic	66/100

Review scores
Publication	Score
4Players	68%
Famitsu	28/40
Gamekult	4/10
GamesMaster	64%
GamesTM	7/10
Jeuxvideo.com	14/20
PlayStation Official Magazine – UK	8/10
Play	52%
PSM3	71%

Ape Academy 2 received "average" reviews according to the review aggregation website Metacritic. GamesMaster described it as "a real mixed bag, but if you really like monkeys and minigames, you might enjoy it." In Japan, Famitsu gave it a score of one six, one eight, one six, and one eight for a total of 28 out of 40.
