= Ape Escape (Japanese TV series) =

Japanese anime television series

- The complete collection DVD box art

レッチュ ゲッチュ サルゲッチュ (Retchu Getchu Saru Getchu)
- Genre: Action, adventure, comedy
- Anime television series
- Directed by: Yorifusa Yamaguchi
- Studio: Shogakukan Music & Digital Entertainment; Sony Computer Entertainment
- Original network: TV Tokyo
- English network: US: Nicktoons (3 episodes only)
- Original run: April 2002 – September 2002
- Episodes: 76
- Anime film

Ape Escape: Battle for the Golden Pipo Helmet
- Directed by: Yorifusa Yamaguchi
- Studio: Shogakukan Music & Digital Entertainment; Sony Computer Entertainment
- Released: August 17, 2002
- Runtime: 22 minutes

Ape Escape, known in Japan as Let's Get Saru Getchu (レッチュ ゲッチュ サルゲッチュ, Retchu Getchu Saru Getchu), is a series of computer-generated anime shorts produced by Shogakukan Music & Digital Entertainment and Sony Computer Entertainment for TV Tokyo in 2002. It is based on the Ape Escape video game series, with the characters and designs based on Ape Escape 2 in particular. The series consists of 76 45-second shorts that aired as part of the Oha Suta variety program in Japan. In 2004, three of these shorts were dubbed into English and aired in the inaugural Nicktoons Film Festival. One of the festival's founders, Frederator Studios, would later produce their own series of Ape Escape shorts in 2009.

A 22-minute movie based on the series, entitled Ape Escape The Movie: Battle for the Golden Pipo Helmet (劇場版サルゲッチュ 黄金のピポヘル・ウッキーバトル), was released on August 17, 2002, in Japan. The film was attached to Beyblade: Fierce Battle and produced with assistance by Polygon Pictures.

Sony Computer Entertainment released a DVD featuring the entire series of shorts, as well as the movie on December 19, 2002, in Japan. The DVD came with a "Yappari Saru Get Chu" dance instruction video, and an exclusive Afrosaru trading card.
