= Malicious (video game) =

2010 video game

- Developer: Alvion
- Publishers: JP: Alvion; WW: Sony Computer Entertainment
- Engine: PhyreEngine
- Platforms: PlayStation 3 PlayStation Vita; PlayStation 4
- Release: PlayStation 3: JP: October 10, 2010; EU: February 8, 2012; NA: July 24, 2012; PlayStation Vita: JP: November 22, 2012; NA: October 8, 2013; EU: October 9, 2013; PlayStation 4: JP: February 10, 2017; NA/EU: February 21, 2017
- Genre: Action-adventure
- Mode: Single-player

Malicious (Note: Japanese: マリシアス, Hepburn: Marishiasu) is an action-adventure video game developed and published by Alvion for the PlayStation 3. It was released on October 27, 2010, in Japan and worldwide in 2012 by Sony Computer Entertainment. An enhanced port of the game was released for the PlayStation Vita titled Malicious Rebirth, featuring a new “Rebirth” chapter with new levels, new bosses and new moves. Another enhanced port, titled Malicious Fallen, was released for the PlayStation 4 in 2017.

== Gameplay ==
The Mantle of Cinders guards the vessel of spirits against Malicious' attacks.

The game is meant to offer a simple play experience. The main goal is to defeat a dangerous group of enemies known as the Keepers, and a great evil entity called the Malicious. There is no actual stage progression in Malicious. Instead, all stages start the player directly in fights against a boss and their subordinates.

The player makes use of a special black mantle that hangs from the main character's neck called the Mantle Of Cinders. The mantle, created using technology from the great prophets, changes into a variety of forms. As an example, the mantle can become fists for close-range melee attacks. It can also become a projectile weapon, making use of "Demon Bullets" to target multiple enemies with a lock on. The mantle can also form a shield to guard against incoming attacks.

The player is able to freely select a stage to play next. The ordering could be important, as defeating a boss gives the character that boss's powers in the form of a new action, which can make it easier to take on the next boss. The difficulty of a stage will change according to how many stages the player has previously cleared, making the stages progressively harder by introducing new subordinate enemies and increasing the boss's health pool. The character also gains power in other areas, including increased jump height and the ability to lock on to a greater number of enemies with "Demon Bullets".

As the main character takes damage, the character's arms and legs will disappear one by one. This serves as a health indicator, and losing all limbs will result in the character's death. However, the player can perform a healing action at the cost of "Aura", which will restore the missing parts of the main character's body (clothes, however, cannot be restored). By defeating subordinate enemies or minions the player will gain "Aura", which can be spent during battle to empower the character's attacks or to restore health and lost limbs.

== Plot ==
The Kingdom of Santville faced a precipitous decline due to its own King Eldrake and the plotting of neighbouring autocrats. While the leaders of the country indulged in their desires, the people of Santville remained oppressed, and rebellion became a distinct possibility. Queen Ashlelei, King Eldrake's wife, attempted to reign in his tyranny, but he imprisoned her on false accusations of fanning the flames of rebellion. With the Queen, who the people heavily favoured over her husband, locked away, the people despaired. One month after the Queen's imprisonment, her son, Valeria, and her daughter, Erica, sneaked into the dungeons to set their mother free. They inform her that the councillors and generals of Santville thirst for power to the point that blood spills at the palace every day in their bids for more influence, and that the neighbouring Ganar Empire has captured most of their land. Along with Valeria's confession that King Eldrake fled the kingdom with eastern barbarian tribes, Erica implores her mother to flee as well, but she refuses due to her love for the people. A group of elders appear from the shadows of the dungeon offering Queen Ashlelei the "power to resist bane" in exchange for the lives of both her children or the lives of all Santville's people, which she refuses, saying that she will defend her people to the best of her own power, alongside her children.

Despite the weakened state of Santville, Queen Ashlelei manages to recapture the lands taken from them by the Ganar Empire, but does not attack any further. With her children serving as adjuncts, Queen Ashlelei managed to recover the kingdom in six months. Just as they were prepared to resume offensive operations on the Ganar Empire, King Eldrake leads an army of barbarians against the capital itself, and with a surprise attack, he manages to make it to the throne room with ease. As Ashlelei is outmatched by Eldrake, Valeria comes to her defense, but is quickly defeated and forced to his knees. Erica reveals a dagger hidden in her clothing and, after berating her father heavily, stabs it into her own heart, prompting Valeria to break free of the barbarians holding him and rush to his sister's side. Erica explains to him that this was an attempted method of taking up the elder's previously rejected offer of power by killing herself, depriving their mother of the choice. Valeria picks up the dagger and stabs himself, too, and when he does, the elders once again appear from the shadows. They offer Ashlelei the strength to resist bane once again, informing her that she must return the power once bane is banished. The power takes the form of a large, red, dual-edged sword named Bloodfall, representative of Valeria, and a silver mask (which is actually a magic shield) representative of Erica. With her newfound power, Ashlelei defeats King Eldrake.

With her mask and the sword Bloodfall, Queen Ashlelei leads a series of operations later to be known as The Seven Days of Guiding Light, in which she leads an offensive against the Eastern Barbarians and territories owned by the Ganar Empire. Ashlelei comes to be known as The Sleepless Queen, due to her refusal to sleep after the deaths of her children, whose remains she keeps in two coffins on either ends of her quarters. One of the elders yet again appears and informs her that true bane has yet to appear, and it will come from a distant land. When she asks him what form the true bane will take, he only replies with "The Malicious."

Three months after The Seven Days of Guiding Light, a giant hole appears at Vilhelm Fortress, one of the territories Santville took after Ashlelei acquired Bloodfall. Believing the cause to be the Malicious, she assembles a great army and departs for the fortress. A giant, reptilian being with numerous tentacles and a face made of gaping mouths awaits outside, and a long battle commences which lasts an entire day, with Ashlelei emerging victorious. An elder appears, and informs Ashlelei that the Malicious they had fought would not be the last, and that she must return the power she acquired from them so that they might combat the next one. Queen Ashlelei refuses, stating that the consequences of the battle were too high for her to return to ordinary life.

In the following seven years, Ashlelei puts all of her efforts into war, acquiring resources for Santville through aggression, leading to Santville becoming the largest body on the continent. Her generals, Galdo and Brann, who also acquired power from the elders, lose control of their weapons, and transform into golems that represent the weapons they carry. Galdo transforms into a statue with two large fists resembling boxing gloves and goes to rest at a fountain plaza named Triumphal Square in Santville's capital. Brann transforms into a large golem resembling a large, tank-like war machine, and goes to rest on an old battleground near the capital. Her mercenary general Carlyle retires to a library on the edge of the kingdom, where he turns into a golem in the shape of a large, black, feral wolf with a pointed spear as its snout. Travis' powers are inherited by his offspring, who takes a central post in the Santville military, leading a military convoy airship. The riches acquired in war only made the state of Santville even worse, and Ashlelei's obsession with war led to the nickname "The Mad Queen" being given to her. Shortly afterwards, she stops appearing in public.

One hundred years pass. The Mad Queen is supposedly gone, but the people living in Santville still live in fear of her. The elders stir the soul of either Valeria of Erica, depending on the player's choice of gender, and instill them into a vessel known as The Spirit Vessel, who dons a weapon on his or her shoulders known as The Mantle of Cinders. Created by the elders using technology called Numerology, The Mantle of Cinders takes on shapes according to the will of its user. Its powers expand when it defeats enemies of the user. The elders explain to Valeria or Erica that due to the exploits of their mother, another Malicious is on the brink of emerging. They bid him or her to use the Mantle of Cinders to hunt down those who broke their oaths to the elders, thereby expanding their arsenal, and then to take on the Malicious. He or she then fights Galdo, Brann, Carlyle, Travis and Ashlelei in order of player choice, before facing off with the Malicious by using the elder's Grand Equational Circle to weaken it. After the Malicious is defeated, the elders explain that more Malicious may inevitably arise, and that it is their job to minimise the malice of humans in order to postpone or prevent it; a goal which they ultimately fail in repeatedly.

The story continues in "Malicious Rebirth," and "Malicious Fallen," which contains all parts of the Malicious story.

== Reception ==
Reception

Aggregate score
Aggregator	Score
Metacritic	(PS3) 67/100

Review scores
Publication	Score
IGN	(PS3) 5.5/10
USGamer	(Vita) 2.5/5
The Vita Lounge	(Vita) 3/5

The game received mixed reviews upon release. Reviewing the original PS3 version, IGN's Colin Moriarty gave the game 5.5/10, which denotes a 'mediocre' game. Though he acknowledged the pleasing visual style and soundtrack, "it suffers from some serious flaws regarding its gameplay, camera, and story that overshadow its pretty graphics and unique approach." In particular, he criticised the camera controls, as well as the lack of story or introduction to the mechanics of the game.

In the USGamer review of the Vita edition of the game, Cassandra Khaw describes it as "decent but little more." Khaw praised the combat of the game, describing it as "spectacular to behold. [...] Effects are loud, flashy and excel at making you feel as though you're in a perennial state of Super Saiyan." But Khaw likewise criticised the camera controls and the floaty feel and repetitive nature of the combat.
