= Ape Escape (American TV series) =

American animated television series

- Cover of UK DVD release
- Genre: Comedy
- Based on: Ape Escape by Sony Computer Entertainment
- Voices of: Annie Mumolo; Greg Ellis; Eric Bauza
- Country of origin: United States
- Original language: English
- No. of episodes: 38

Production
- Running time: 2 minutes
- Production companies: Frederator Studios; Hawaii Film Partners; Project 51 Productions; MarkMark Toons; Showcase Entertainment

Original release
- Network: Nicktoons Network
- Release: July 5, 2009

Ape Escape is an American series of animated shorts developed by Frederator Studios, Hawaii Film Partners, Project 51 Productions and Showcase Entertainment which aired on Nicktoons Network in 2009. It is based on Sony Computer Entertainment's Ape Escape video game franchise, with characters and designs based on Ape Escape 2 in particular, and focuses around Specter's attempts to take over the world with his monkey army.

== Development ==
Frederator obtained the cartoon rights to Ape Escape on May 31, 2007. Various talents were brought in to help, including Doug TenNapel. The character designs are based on Ape Escape 2, with Jimmy as the protagonist. The animations are primarily animated using Adobe Flash. The shorts were completed in 2008 and premiered on Nicktoons on July 5, 2009. The shorts were released on DVD in the United Kingdom by Lionsgate Home Entertainment on February 18, 2013.

== Cast ==
- Annie Mumolo as Jimmy and Natalie
- Greg Ellis as Specter
- Eric Bauza as Professor and the Pipo Monkeys

== See also ==
- Ape Escape (Japanese TV series) – a 2002 series of Ape Escape television shorts that aired on TV Tokyo that is also known by the title Ju Retsu Saru Getchu
- Saru Get You -On Air- – a 2006 Japanese anime television series based on the Ape Escape video game franchise
