= EyeToy: Monkey Mania =

2004 video game

- Developer(s): Sony Computer Entertainment Japan
- Publisher(s): Sony Computer Entertainment
- Composer(s): Soichi Terada
- Series: Ape Escape; EyeToy
- Platform(s): PlayStation 2
- Release: JP: August 5, 2004; EU: March 18, 2005; AU: March 24, 2005
- Genre(s): Party
- Mode(s): Single-player, multiplayer

EyeToy: Monkey Mania, released in Japan as Saru Eye Toy Ōsawagi! Wakki Waki Game Tenkomori!! (Note: Japanese: サルアイトーイ 大騒ぎ！ウッキウキゲームてんこもり!!, Hepburn: Saru Ai Tōi Ōsawagi! Wakki Waki Gēmu Tenkomori!!, lit. "Monkey EyeToy Mania! Wakki Waki Game Extravaganza!!"), is a party game developed and published by Sony Computer Entertainment for the PlayStation 2. A spin-off of the Ape Escape series, it requires the EyeToy camera peripheral to be played. The game consists of the franchise's titular monkeys engaging in minigames, with multiplayer for up to four players. The title was sold as a standalone game, and also in a bundle with a silver-colored EyeToy peripheral.

== Gameplay ==
The game includes over 50 minigames that can be played individually or as part of a board game-style adventure on Freaky Floaty Island. Players can earn points by completing minigames and use them to set traps and obstacles for their opponents.

== Reception ==
Reception

Aggregate score
Aggregator	Score
Metacritic	59/100

Review scores
Publication	Score
Famitsu	25/40
Jeuxvideo.com	8/20
MeriStation	6/10
PALGN	5.5/10
The Sydney Morning Herald	3.5/5 stars

The game received "mixed" reviews according to the review aggregation website Metacritic. In Japan, Famitsu gave it a score of one five, one six, and two sevens for a total of 25 out of 40.
