= Ape Escape =

Video game series

- Official series logo
- Genres: Platform; Action-adventure; Party
- Developers: Japan Studio; Shift; Epics h.a.n.d.
- Publisher: Sony Interactive Entertainment: NA: Ubisoft (Note: 2 and Pumped and Primed only.)
- Platforms: PlayStation; PlayStation 2 PlayStation 3 PlayStation 4 PlayStation 5 PlayStation Portable; PlayStation Vita
- First release: Ape Escape; June 22, 1999
- Latest release: PlayStation Move Ape Escape; July 5, 2011

Ape Escape (Note: Known in Japan as Saru Get You (サルゲッチュ, Saru Getchu)) is a series of video games developed primarily by Japan Studio and published and owned by Sony Interactive Entertainment. The series incorporates ape-related humour, unique gameplay, and a wide variety of pop culture references. The first game in the series is the first to require the DualShock or Dual Analog controller to play.

== History ==
The game was developed in 1997 under the name Sarugetchu, and was the first game to explicitly require the DualShock controller. The game was a success, going Platinum, entering the Greatest Hits series in the US, and entered the "Best Of" releases in Japan. It was reviewed positively, and was compared to games such as Super Mario 64.

Ape Escape 2001 was released in 2001. It is the first game in the series to have been developed for PlayStation 2. The next year, Ape Escape 2 was developed by Sony and published in Japan in 2002 and in Europe and North America in 2003.

In 2003, SCEI worked on a multiplayer party game and the sequel to Piposaru 2001. Ape Escape: Pumped & Primed was released in Japan through Sony Computer Entertainment Inc. and the US through Ubisoft in 2004. Ape Escape: On the Loose, a remake of the original game was released globally as one of the launch games for the PlayStation Portable.

In 2005, Ape Academy (also known as Ape Escape Academy) was released for the PlayStation Portable. Eye Toy: Monkey Mania was a party game inspired by Mario Party which was only released in Europe and Japan. In mid-2005, Ape Escape 3 was released to positive critical reception.

After the release of Ape Escape 3, Sony Computer Entertainment Europe showed interest in publishing Ape Academy 2 and Ape Escape: Million Monkeys; however, Sony Computer Entertainment America showed more interest in developing its own game. Ape Academy 2 was released in 2006 for the PlayStation Portable to mixed success and sold very well in Japan, entering the "Best of" category, but failed to perform well in Europe, due to Sony focusing on Million Monkeys. Million Monkeys was released in Japan in July 2006, making it the last official PlayStation 2 game in the series. The game was planned to be released in the United Kingdom in late 2006, but the game was postponed and later canceled. Its impact in Japan led to the inclusion of its iteration of series protagonist Spike in PlayStation All-Stars Battle Royale in 2012. In late 2006, Saru Get You: Pipo Saru Racer was released in Japan for PlayStation Portable. In 2008, Japan Studio and h.a.n.d. developed Ape Escape: SaruSaru Big Mission. Both titles were never released outside Japan.

In 2006, Sony placed an advertisement in a Famitsu magazine with interest in hiring staff for an upcoming game. It contains a picture with four monkeys, with the first holding up Ape Escape, the second holding up Ape Escape 2, the third holding up Ape Escape 3 and the fourth holding a cover with "?". The fourth entry was in development, but is still unreleased. A tweet by Sony Computer Entertainment Japan on Twitter was posted on January 5, 2016, reading, "2016 Year of the Monkey. Today, SCE will begin working! #Monkey #YearofMonkey" alongside an image of a Pipo Monkey". In 2019, the 20th anniversary of the franchise, for the first time in more than 5 years, the official Japanese website for the Ape Escape series was updated and an official Japanese Ape Escape 20th anniversary account was made on Twitter.

Ape Quest, a role-playing game, was released in 2008 on the PSN store in North America and Europe and in March 2009 in Japan. It was co-developed by Shift and Alvion and published by Sony Computer Entertainment worldwide. It was the first game in the series to be a PSN-only game, excluding Asia, where it received a physical release. In 2009, a game titled Ape Escape was announced along with the PlayStation Move. Critics speculated that it was the fourth entry in the series, after Sony's 2006 advertisement. In Q3 2010, PlayStation Move: Ape Escape was officially announced under the party genre, and with a different name for every region. It was released in Japan in December 2010, Asia in January 2011, and the UK and Europe in mid-2012 as a GameStop exclusive. In the US, the game was only made available on the PSN store. After the release of PlayStation Move: Ape Escape, no games were announced in 2012, making it the first year since 2002 that no Ape Escape game had been released and the first year that no game had been announced within each region.

== Games ==
Release timeline
1999	Ape Escape
2000
2001	Pipo Saru 2001
2002	Ape Escape 2
2003
2004	Ape Escape: Pumped & Primed
2004	EyeToy: Monkey Mania
2004	Ape Escape Academy
2005	Ape Escape: On the Loose
2005	Ape Escape 3
2005	Ape Academy 2
2006	Saru! Get You! Million Monkeys
2006	Saru Get You: Pipo Saru Racer
2007	Saru! Get You! SaruSaru Big Mission
2008	Ape Quest
2009
2010	PlayStation Move Ape Escape

=== Main series ===
- Ape Escape (PlayStation) – June 1999
- Ape Escape 2 (PlayStation 2) – July 2002
- Ape Escape: On the Loose (PlayStation Portable) – March 2005
- Ape Escape 3 (PlayStation 2) – July 2005

=== Spin-offs ===
- Pipo Saru 2001 (PlayStation 2) (Japan only) – July 2001
- Saru! Get You! Million Monkeys (PlayStation 2) (Japan only) – July 2006
- Saru Get You: Pipo Saru Racer (PlayStation Portable) (Japan only) – December 2006
- Saru! Get You! SaruSaru Big Mission (PlayStation Portable) (Japan only) – July 2007
- Ape Quest (PlayStation Portable) (released in North America & Europe exclusively on the PlayStation Store and a UMD in Japan only) – January 2008

=== Party games ===
- Ape Escape: Pumped & Primed (PlayStation 2) (Japan & North America only) – July 2004
- EyeToy: Monkey Mania (PlayStation 2) (Japan & Europe only) – August 2004
- Ape Escape Academy (PlayStation Portable) – December 2004
- Ape Academy 2 (PlayStation Portable) (Japan & Europe only) – December 2005
- PlayStation Move Ape Escape (PlayStation 3) – December 2010

=== Guest appearances ===
- Monster Rancher 4
- Everybody's Golf 4
- Ratchet & Clank: Up Your Arsenal
- Metal Gear Solid 3: Snake Eater
- Ratchet: Deadlocked
- LittleBigPlanet
- PlayStation All-Stars Battle Royale
- Super Bomberman R: Shiny Edition
- Astro's Playroom
- Astro Bot
- Metal Gear Solid Delta: Snake Eater

== Story ==
=== Main series ===
A white-haired monkey named Specter obtains a helmet known as the Peak Point Helmet (Pipo Helmet for short), which boosts his intelligence. After equipping an army of monkeys with Pipo Helmets, and using an enhanced helmet for himself, Specter sends his monkey army to take over the world, and Space. The protagonists, equipped with various gadgets, must capture the monkeys and restore order to the world.

=== Party video games ===
The party video games take place outside of the original continuity. Specter and the Monkeys take over the world, or try to sabotage players in Pumped and Primed. In both games, Specter does not end up being the main villain and there are usually darker forces behind Specter that the player must defeat. The villains change from game to game. It is up to the game's protagonists, equipped with various gadgets, to capture or defeat monkeys/characters, to save the day.

== Gameplay ==
The Ape Escape series is notable for its radical departure from the tried-and-true control method in many other games. It was the first PlayStation game to require the use of a DualShock or Dual Analog controller; the left stick moves the character while the right operates whatever gadget the character has in its possession. Again, unlike many games which use to jump, both the R1 and R2 buttons are used, while the 'shape' buttons are used to cycle through the available items in the inventory.

In the PSP spin-offs, a more conventional control scheme must be used, due to the lack of a right analog stick.

The main objective through the majority of the games is to use the available array of gadgets to locate and capture monkeys. When a monkey has been found, it must be caught with the Time Net gadget. On the first playthrough, players will have a set number of monkeys to catch before progressing towards the next level. Once each level has been completed, they can be reentered with the gadgets necessary to catch the remaining monkeys.

=== Minigames ===
In the main series, there are three unlockable minigames that can be played at the hub. These can be accessed by clearing the necessary number of stages and/or having the necessary amount of coins. In Ape Escape and Ape Escape: On the Loose, the player had to collect a certain amount of Specter Tokens to unlock a minigame.

In Ape Escape 2, the player could obtain these three minigames by betting ten coins in the Gotcha Box, but here the stage-clearing was more important, yet it did not mean it would be based on the percentage on the player's record.

In Ape Escape 3, because coins were far more abundant than Ape Escape 2 and the fact that players could hold coins past 999, the prices went up for the mini-games as well. Also, in this game it was based on the player's percentage, so clearing stages, beating time attacks, or purchasing things from the shops would make the mini games available for purchase sooner. The minigame Mesal Gear Solid seems fuller and more of a game of its own rather than just a simple unlockable. This game has a plot and more traditional gameplay of the AE series, and could be the start of more fuller minigames based on a series already established, like Metal Gear Solid.

In Ape Quest, the player randomly encounters mini-games in a very similar fashion to classic JRPG random enemy encounters.

== Other media ==
=== Other video games ===
- Ape Escape has been referenced, alongside numerous other PlayStation franchises, in the Astro Bot series of video games, most notably in the 2024 Astro Bot video game, which features an entire level, "Apes on the Loose", themed after the Ape Escape games.

=== Television ===
- Ape Escape (Japanese TV series): a 2002 series of computer-generated anime shorts for Tokyo TV
- Ape Escape (American TV series): a 2009 series of animated shorts created by American studio Frederator Studios for Nicktoons
- Saru Get You -On Air-: a 2006 Japanese anime television series based on the franchise

=== Manga ===
- CoroCoro comics, monthly manga magazine
