= Saru! Get You! Million Monkeys =

2006 video game

- Developer: Sony Computer Entertainment Japan
- Publisher: Sony Computer Entertainment
- Composer: Soichi Terada
- Series: Ape Escape
- Platform: PlayStation 2
- Release: JP: July 13, 2006
- Genre: Platform
- Modes: Single-player, Multiplayer

Saru! Get You! Million Monkeys (Note: Japanese: サルゲッチュ! ミリオンモンキーズ, Hepburn: Saru Getchu! Mirion Monkīzu) is a 2006 platform video game developed and published by Sony Computer Entertainment for the PlayStation 2 as part of the Ape Escape series. It was released throughout Asia a year after the series' previous title Ape Escape 3. The game was planned to be released in the United Kingdom in late 2006. Ultimately, it was never released outside of Asia.

== Plot ==
The game has two story plots to play. One is "Team Kakeru" referring to the main heroes of the series, the other "Team Specter" which refers to enemy Specter and the monkeys. Each "team" has their own plot, which involves the same gameplay, but the story has changed.

In "Team Kakeru" mode, the story starts with the main heroes gathering in Tokyo. The professor's computer program in the form of the character "Chall", alerts them of the disaster happening in the city. It is shown that Specter has joined forces with an alien race, to take over the world once more. However, it's later revealed that the "alien race" are mutant versions of the breed "Pipotron" which take the DNA of the Pipotron Monkeys, and uses it to create other creatures to help dominate the globe. The player is left to destroy any of the Specter's Robot's and Monkeys and restore order to the world. Once Specter has been defeated, monkeys run wild throughout the city, and the game takes a turn in a different direction, and the player is left to save the globe from being destroyed by mutant creatures around the world.

In "Team Specter", Specter is on vacation and is alerted by the Piposaru that the monkeys have started to take over the world, without his permission. He is shown that someone has created a Specter impostor, and Specter goes to save the world, before he is defeated. Once the impostor is defeated, it's revealed it was a Pipotron called "Meta" and it can take form of any living creature. The Pipotrons used Meta to take control of the monkeys, and now that he is gone, the monkeys have gone wild throughout Tokyo, and mutant creatures have taken over the city. It's now up to Specter and his team to save the world.

== Gameplay ==
The gameplay uses the action based gameplay from the party title Ape Escape: Pumped & Primed, and mixes it with the platforming ape catching of the original title. Players use different weapons to destroy machines, and creatures lurking throughout the city. Players also use Gadgets to defeat monkeys, and use the "Monkey Net" to catch them. Each mission requires a different goal. Sometimes is needed to defeat a boss, other times to defeat a set of Targets, defend certain characters or weapons that will help throughout the game or sometimes need to capture a set of monkeys. Each mission containing monkeys has up to 100 monkeys available for capture. The more the players capture, the more "Gotcha Points" get added to their total score, which helps to unlock certain items in various ways. Missions eighteen and nineteen differ from the rest of the game. It requires to solve virtual puzzles within a time limit. This is the only occasion where Gadgets are no longer necessary to win the mission.

== Reception ==
It was described as a "Recipe for Success" according to Yahoo Italy. They added: "Take the beauty of butterflies, a few hundred monkeys out of your mind and mix well with a simple yet innovative game play and graphics up to date. Bake for a few minutes in a preheated oven of Sony Computer Entertainment, and voila, here is Ape Escape!" It was received positively noting that the game strays away from its previous titles. They also mentioned missions eighteen to nineteen as the most creative levels a game in this genre has ever seen, also mentioning how it fits within the game, despite the game being solely on action based gameplay.
