= PlayStation Move Ape Escape =

2010 video game

- European cover art
- Developer: Japan Studio
- Publisher: Sony Computer Entertainment
- Series: Ape Escape
- Engine: Havok
- Platform: PlayStation 3
- Release: JP: December 9, 2010; AU: June 23, 2011; EU: June 24, 2011; NA: July 5, 2011 (PlayStation Store)
- Genres: Rail shooter, party
- Mode: Single-player

PlayStation Move Ape Escape, simply titled Ape Escape in Europe and known in Asian countries as Ape Escape: On the Move! and in Japan as Furi Furi! Saru Get You, (Note: Furi Furi! Saru Get You (フリフリ！ サルゲッチュ, Furi Furi! Sarugetchu; lit. "Shake! Shake! Ape Escape")) is a 2010 rail shooter and party video game developed and published by Sony Computer Entertainment for the PlayStation 3. It is part of the Ape Escape series.

The game was originally announced at the Tokyo Game Show 2009 as one of the titles supporting the PlayStation Move controller. It was released on December 9, 2010 in Japan, on June 24, 2011 in Europe, and on July 5, 2011 in North America.

== Gameplay ==
Screenshot showing the first-person view of the game

Unlike other games in the Ape Escape series, the game is an on-rails shooting game rather than a platformer. Players view the game from a first-person perspective with the motion controller acting as a gadget on-screen which include a floating net, a slingshot and a harisen. Players cycle through their arsenal using the Move button while either pressing the trigger button or performing gestures to utilize the gadget. For example, players swing the net to catch monkeys, press the trigger button to fire slingshots and wave the controller to use the fan.

Players traverse from area to area via an on-rails method. Each area is filled with monkeys and players must ultimately catch all of them using the net. Each gadget is used for a different purpose: slingshots are used to annoy monkeys, destroy objects, and shoot banana power-ups, while the fan is used to blow away debris. To shift the camera players press either the "X" or "O" buttons to turn left or right respectively.

== Development ==
An Ape Escape game for the PlayStation 3 (working title "Ape Escape") was confirmed as a PlayStation Move title in Tokyo Game Show 2009 in September.

A trailer for PlayStation Move was released. It displayed a one-second clip of the game, which involved the player catching monkeys with a net, using the move controller, in first-person view. Another image was released by Ape Club. It contained a picture of the "Gadget Widget", displaying the gadgets, and a new addition showing batteries. A full trailer for the game was finally released which was shown at the Tokyo Game Show 2010 on September 16.

In January 2011, an English version of the game was released in Asian countries like Singapore along with a PlayStation Move bundle in 2011 under the name Ape Escape: On the Move!. During the summer of 2011, the game was released for the US PlayStation Store.

== Reception ==
Reception

Aggregate score
Aggregator	Score
Metacritic	43/100

Review scores
Publication	Score
Eurogamer	3/10
Famitsu	27/40
GamesMaster	52%
GameSpot	4/10
GamesTM	3/10
IGN	4/10
PlayStation Official Magazine – UK	5/10
PALGN	4.5/10
Play	55%
PSM3	4/10
Push Square	6/10
Metro	4/10

The game received "unfavorable" reviews according to the review aggregation website Metacritic. IGN's Jack DeVries disliked the game and found that it was "missing a lot of shooter fundamentals like additional weapons, co-op, and challenge", concluding that it was "an embarrassing, shovelware shooter that feels more like a bargain bin Wii title than a first party affair". In Japan, Famitsu gave it a score of three sevens and one six for a total of 27 out of 40.
