= Shinichiro Yokota =

Japanese music producer

Shinichiro Yokota 横田 信一郎
- Born: July 12, 1969 (age 56); Ōta, Tokyo, Japan
- Origin: Tokyo, Japan
- Genres: Downtempo; deep house; tech house
- Occupations: Producer; customized car part creator
- Instrument: Synthesizer · vocoder · rhodes piano
- Years active: 1987–1992; 2016–present
- Labels: Far East Recording; Sound of Vast

Shinichiro Yokota (横田 信一郎, Yokota Shin'ichirō; born July 12, 1969) is a Japanese DJ and record producer known for his single "Do It Again," which gained significant attention due to an incorrect credit on YouTube that mistakenly attributed the track to Soichi Terada. His early exposure to music came in his childhood when he learned of the band Yellow Magic Orchestra, which inspired him to start pursuing music.

After discovering hip hop in the 1980s, he began producing beats and collaborating with artists in the genre. In 1990, Yokota co-founded the label Far East Recording with Terada, but it faced limited success. Despite a hiatus from music and ventures into other industries, he made a comeback in 2016 with the album Do It Again and Again.

Influenced by synthesizer-based works of Ryuichi Sakamoto and Akiko Yano, Yokota has been recognized as a pioneer of Japanese house music alongside Terada. His music, characterized by its electronic and house genres including downtempo, deep house, and tech house, features a minimalist style that emphasizes beats, bass, and vocals.

== Early life and education ==
Yokota was born on July 12, 1969, in the Ōta of Tokyo, Japan. As a child, he played baseball and engaged in activities like football and swimming. He also enjoyed playing his father's electric organ. While he was an elementary school student, Yokota was introduced to the band Yellow Magic Orchestra, which he credited as a formative musical moment because he had previously been listening to "many fake Japanese Beatles bands" before Yellow Magic Orchestra came onto the scene. After hearing them, Yokota quit playing baseball and started taking classical piano lessons. He used his otoshidama money to buy his first synthesizer, a Casio MT-40. After the breakup of Yellow Magic Orchestra, Yokota discovered hip hop through a midnight radio program, leading him to shift from synthesizers to creating his own beats. He became a supporting member of Puzzle Jam Rockers and was involved in the production of early hip-hop albums such as Krush Posse and East End while doing track making and turntablism.

== Early music career and retirement ==
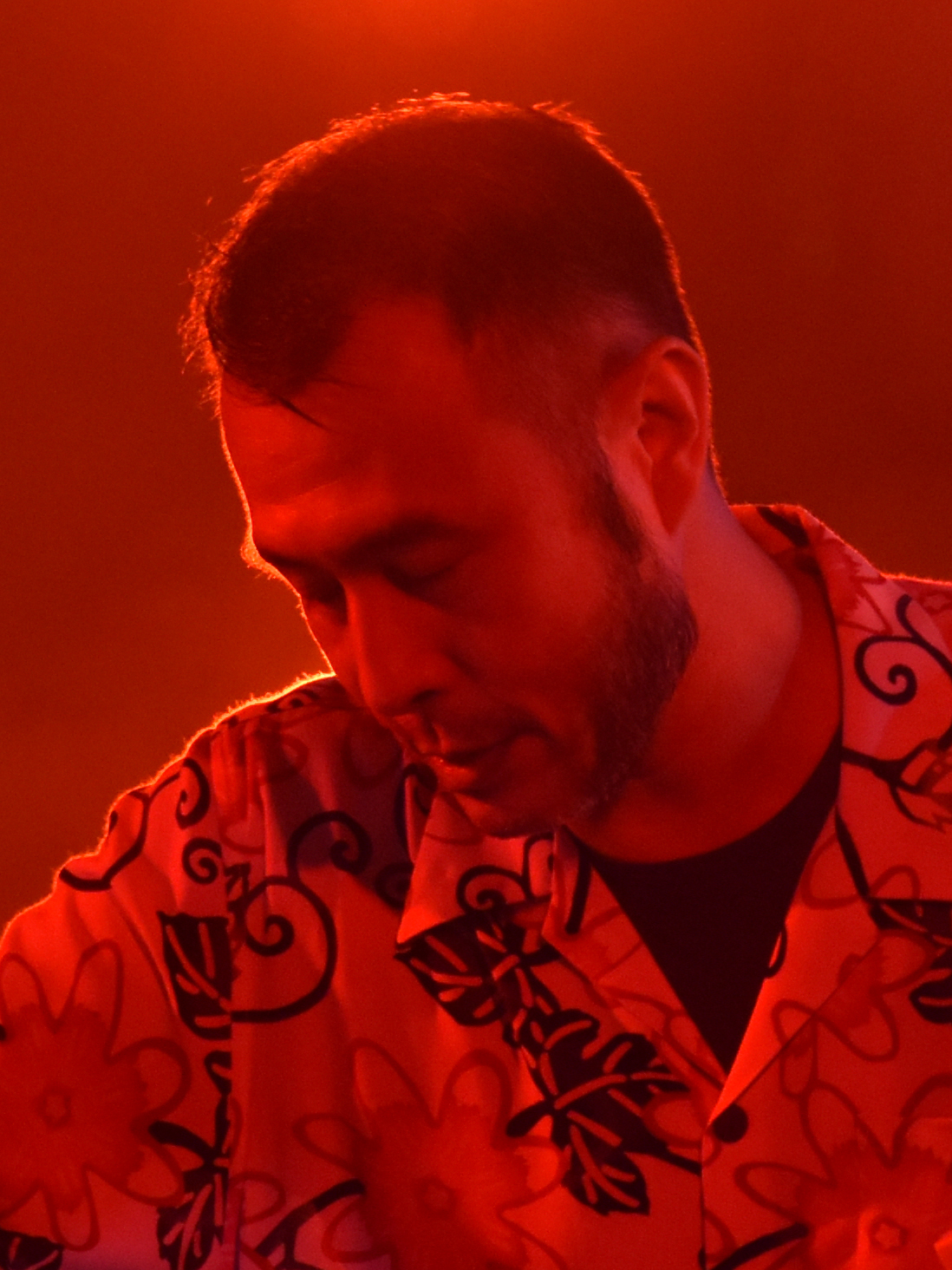
Yokota began a friendship with Soichi Terada in 1987, and the two founded the label Far East Recording in 1990.

Yokota met fellow producer Soichi Terada through a mutual friend in 1987 after both attended an All Japan DJ contest. Inspired by Terada's performance of an original production, Yokota was soon introduced to house music by Terada. He began making house music, but found it challenging to connect with others who shared his musical interests, as the dominant styles of electronic music in Tokyo at the time were Hi-NRG and eurobeat.

In 1990, Yokota and Terada founded the label Far East Recording, which released its first album, also titled Far East Recording, in 1992. The album had little success, and Terada ended up with boxes of unsold records at his home. While Terada continued to release music, Yokota lost motivation, feeling disenchanted by the rapid technological advancements. In the same year, he started a custom car parts company with his wife, Night Pager, which specialized in tuning sports cars and modifying limiters for competition racers. In 2011, another company he created that sold camera parts went bankrupt. However, he managed to restart his business.

== Resurgence and return to music ==
"Do It Again"
A 30-second sample of "Do It Again," which was incorrectly attributed to Soichi Terada.

On February 18, 2013, the YouTube channel UtopiaSpb, known for uploading various house songs, uploaded Yokota's song "Do It Again," mistakenly crediting Terada. The video gained significant views due to the platform's algorithm. Terada himself commented on the video to correct the inaccuracy, but the channel has not been active since the upload. In 2015, the compilation album Sounds from the Far East was released by the Dutch label Rush Hour, curated by the DJ and producer Hunee. In May 2016, Yokota made a return to music with a set in the Boiler Room, marking his first club performance in 25 years. On November 30, 2016, Yokota released Do It Again and Again, his first full-length solo album featuring both unreleased 1990s tracks and new material. Yokota described it as a compilation of his whole life as a producer, allowing him to relive his memories.

On September 25, 2019, Yokota released the album, I Know You Like It, which the Tokyo Weekender described as a collection of "tracks both old and new" in their top favorite Japanese albums of that year. Later, on October 21, 2019, he released the compilation album Ultimate Yokota 1991–2019 on Dutch label Sound of Vast. This album included songs from his previous two albums that had not been available in vinyl form before. The album included the song "Tokyo 018," featuring Terada, marking the first time they collaborated in 15 years. It was rated number three on DJ Mag's list of the top 25 compilations of 2019, with the song "Bells" from the album ranked number five on Magnetic Magazine's list of the 15 best bass music tracks of October 2019.

In 2021, Yokota collaborated with other musicians, including the minimal noise group D49 and J-pop singer Rinapon. Yokota stated that despite the COVID-19 pandemic in Japan, he was still able to collaborate with both Japanese and international musicians because everyone was online. On November 22, 2021, he released the album Tokonoma Style, which was described as traversing genres such as house, techno, pop, funk, and hip hop.

== Artistry ==
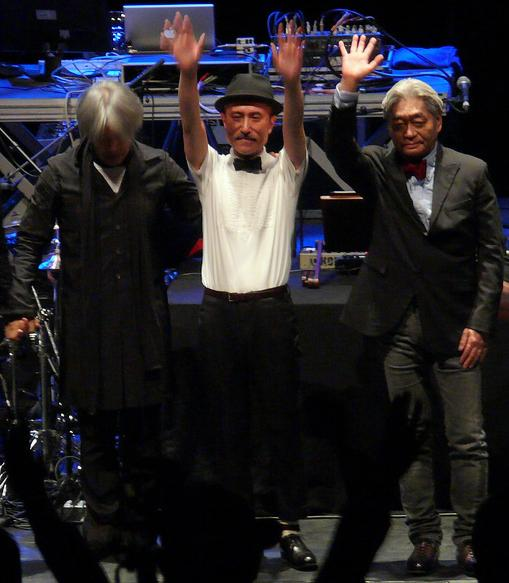
Yokota cited Yellow Magic Orchestra for inspiring him to take up music.

Yokota has cited Japanese musicians such as Yellow Magic Orchestra and Isao Tomita, as well as the German band Kraftwerk, as his main inspirations. He was also influenced by hip hop early in his life, mentioning songs like "Planet Rock" by Afrika Bambaataa, "Reckless" by Chris Taylor and Ice-T, and "Riccochet" by the B. B. & Q. Band as having a positive impact on him. In an interview with The Glow, Yokota mentioned that works by Ryuichi Sakamoto and Akiko Yano, along with the use of synthesizers, were significant inspirations during his early years. He and Terada have been described as pioneers of Japanese house music. Mia Patillo of Mixmag described Yokota as "timeless" and praised his ability to create "sophisticated music with only the essential elements at hand".

Yokota's music primarily spans electronic and house genres, including downtempo, deep house, and tech house. His style bears resemblance to that of his collaborator Soichi Terada, as well as artists like Galaxy 2 Galaxy, Los Microwaves, and Larry Heard. Yokota favors a simpler musical style, emphasizing "beats and bass from the rhythm machine and vocals on top." As Yokota couldn't understand English, he selected samples based on their musical quality. In an interview with Mixmag, he said, "What I do understand and listen for is the ‘hibiki’." The song "Do It Again" used a sample from Derek B's "Good Groove", with Mixmag noting that he "[warped] the refrain from alluring to enchanting to mingle with the track’s evocative melody and chords."

== Discography ==
List of studio albums
Title	Album details
Far East Recording	Released: 1992; Label: Far East Recording; Format: LP, CD
Do It Again And Again	Released: November 30, 2016; Label: Far East Recording; Format: CD, streaming
Ultimate Yokota 1991–2019	Released: October 21, 2019; Label: Sound of Vast; Format: CD, streaming
Tokonoma Style	Released: November 22, 2021; Label: Far East Recording; Format: LP, CD, streaming
