= Ape Quest =

2008 video game

- PlayStation Store icon
- Developers: Shift; Alvion (Note: Additional work by Japan Studio.)
- Publisher: Sony Computer Entertainment
- Series: Ape Escape
- Platform: PlayStation Portable
- Release: NA: January 10, 2008; EU: May 1, 2008; JP: March 19, 2009
- Genre: Role-playing video game
- Mode: Single-player

Ape Quest (known as Sarugetchu: Piposaru Senki in Japan) is a role-playing video game developed by Shift and Alvion and published by Sony Computer Entertainment for the PlayStation Portable. It is a spin-off of the Ape Escape series. It was released in North America and Europe exclusively on the PlayStation Store and a UMD in Japan only. It is downloadable as a free Starter Pack, with the remainder of the game available as three separate downloadable chapters.

== Premise ==
The king of the Toqsica Kingdom sends his son with the respected knight D'Apetagnan on a pilgrimage to the seal that holds the Apetron, a group of apes that terrorized the kingdom ages ago, who also are known as the Pipotron Brothers. However, the king's son impulsively eats the banana-shaped seal, releasing the Apetron upon the land again. Now, the prince must save the land from its curse.

== Gameplay ==
The player takes control of the prince and travels across various areas, meeting Ape Team members, fighting monsters, earning Chips (the game's currency) and carrying out quests. The player must choose from predetermined routes consisting of turns, in the way of a board game. The player traverses across these routes, but once chosen, the player cannot move or stop. On each turn, the player can open the menu, which allows the player to save, equip items and perform other actions (this can be done at the end of each route as well). Turn-based battles and minigames can also occur randomly. Battles rely on the equipment used and strength. Minigames, on the other hand, are entirely based on skill (these can deduct hit points, or "Guts", as well). The player can also visit towns and dungeons as well as members of the Ape Team.

=== Ape Team ===
The Ape Team is composed of ape warriors that the player can summon in a fight (at the cost of Chips) if the player is in a tough spot. The player can collect different members by talking to them around the area, who are all supply peddlers. After talking with them, they are added on the list of Ape Team members. Also, all Ape Team members have a relationship value, which increases when purchasing items from them.

=== Bosses ===
The game's storyline revolves around destroying various golems throughout each area. These take the form of a lion, a wolf, a snake and a crab, among others. These are in minigame form and usually involve dodging attacks until the foe moves in, then attacking.

== Reception ==
Jeff Haynes of IGN praised the game's humor and criticized the repetitive nature of its gameplay.
