= Ape Escape: Pumped & Primed =

2004 video game

- North American cover art
- Developer: Sony Computer Entertainment Japan
- Publishers: JP: Sony Computer Entertainment; NA: Ubisoft
- Composer: Soichi Terada
- Series: Ape Escape
- Platform: PlayStation 2
- Release: JP: July 1, 2004; NA: October 19, 2004
- Genre: Party
- Modes: Single-player, multiplayer

Ape Escape: Pumped & Primed (Note: Japanese: ガチャメカスタジアム サルバト～レ, Hepburn: Gacha Meka Sutajiamu Saru Bato〜re) is a 2004 party video game developed and published by Sony Computer Entertainment for the PlayStation 2. It is a spin-off of the Ape Escape series and the final installment in the series to be released by Ubisoft in North America. It was never released in Europe, despite being advertised in the United Kingdom and Australia; therefore, no PAL version of the game exists.

== Gameplay ==
Spike, Natalie, Casi and the Professor join the High-tech Tournament, a virtual world. Helga, the previous champion, is on an important mission to find the disk based on her father's research, hidden in the trophy. Unlike other Ape Escape games, this game is more of a party game, similar to Mario Party and Sonic Shuffle. The game consists of a series of competitive minigames using various vehicles and gadgets from previous Ape Escape games, such as battling underwater using submersibles, racing on foot, and collecting the most coins. The story mode is broken up into different tournaments with 3 to 4 players, where 1 to 2 players must finish at least 1st place to pass.

== Reception ==
Reception

Aggregate score
Aggregator	Score
Metacritic	61/100

Review scores
Publication	Score
Edge	5/10
Electronic Gaming Monthly	5.83/10 (Note: Two critics of Electronic Gaming Monthly gave the game each a score of 5.5/10, and the other gave it 6.5/10.)
Famitsu	28/40
Game Informer	5.5/10
GameSpot	6.4/10
GameZone	7/10
IGN	6.3/10
Official U.S. PlayStation Magazine	2.5/5
PlayStation: The Official Magazine	6/10
X-Play	2/5
Detroit Free Press	2/4

The game received "mixed or average" reviews, according to the review aggregation website Metacritic. Reviewers pointed that its high qualities lie in its visual and sound effects, and on its game mechanics, but it lacks re-playability and overall appeal. In Japan, Famitsu gave it a better score of all four sevens for a total of 28 out of 40.
