= Ape Escape 2 =

2002 video game

- North American cover art
- Developer: Sony Computer Entertainment Japan
- Publishers: WW: Sony Computer Entertainment; NA: Ubi Soft
- Director: Naoto Ohta
- Producer: Yasuhide Kobayashi
- Composer: Koji Hayama
- Series: Ape Escape
- Platform: PlayStation 2
- Release: JP: July 18, 2002; EU: March 14, 2003; NA: July 1, 2003; CHN: January 15, 2004
- Genres: Platform, action-adventure
- Mode: Single-player

Ape Escape 2 (Note: Known as Saru! Get You! 2 (サルゲッチュ2, Saru Getchu Tsū) in Japan) is a 2002 platform game developed and published by Sony Computer Entertainment for the PlayStation 2. The second main installment of the Ape Escape series, it was released in Japan in July 2002, Europe in March 2003, North America in July 2003 by Ubi Soft, also the game received a chinese release in January 15, 2004 for Mainland China. It received generally positive reviews from critics. The game was later used as the basis for the Ape Escape animated series by Frederator Studios.

== Gameplay ==
Ape Escape 2, like its predecessor, is a platform game in which players control Hikaru (Note: The version of the game released in the United Kingdom uses the original Japanese names, while the version released in the United States and Canada changes the names.) (Jimmy in the North American English version) as he catches monkeys spread across each level. Like the previous game, players control Hikaru using the left analog stick and shoulder buttons while using the right analog stick to control various Gotcha Gadgets that are unlocked as the player progresses through the game. Along with returning gadgets such as the Stun Club, Monkey Net, Super Hoop, Water Net, Slingback Shooter, RC Car, and Sky Flyer, Ape Escape 2 introduces three new gadgets; the Bananarang, which attracts monkeys with its scent, the Water Cannon, which puts out fires, and the Electro Magnet, which can be used on magnetic surfaces. The Magic Punch, a gadget from the first game unlocked in the post-game, also makes a return. New to the game is the monkey sidekick, Pipotchi, who accompanies Hikaru through most of the game. While with Hikaru, Pipotchi can give the player hints, help Hikaru reach ledges, and revive him once per life when his health is depleted.

Throughout the game, players can collect golden Gotcha Coins, which become more valuable when collected in quick succession. These coins can be spent on the Gotcha Box gashapon machine to unlock bonus material. Along with various collectibles such as concept art, music, comic strips, and fables, players can unlock three brand new minigames; Monkey Football, Dance Monkey Dance, and Monkey Climber, which can be played with up to two players. Monkey Soccer (known as Monkey Football outside of North America) is an association football game, Dance Monkey Dance is a rhythm game requiring players to match dance moves to the rhythm, and Monkey Climber is a challenging game requiring players to navigate a monkey across vines. Completing the game unlocks a New Game+ mode in which players can play as the previous game's hero, Kakeru (Spike in North America).

== Story ==
The game takes place after the events in Ape Escape, where Kakeru (Spike in the North American English) stopped Specter from taking over the world. It is a few years later, and the Professor left for a vacation leaving his granddaughter Natsumi (Natalie in the North American versions), and Kakeru's cousin Hikaru (Jimmy in the North American English version) to watch over the laboratory. The Professor has left them with one task: deliver a load of monkey pants to the monkeys in Monkey Park. Hikaru accidentally sends not only the monkey pants, but some Monkey Helmets as well, wrecking the laboratory in the process. Specter gets a hold of one, and yet again makes an army of monkeys bent on ruling the world. Under Natsumi's orders, Hikaru, accompanied by a friendly baby Pipo Monkey named Pipotchi, sets out to capture all the monkeys and stop Specter. However, Specter has supplied five monkeys, the Freaky Monkey Five, with Vita-Z bananas, making them stronger and more intelligent than the average monkeys.

Hikaru manages to capture all of the Freaky Monkey Five, except Yellow Monkey, who flees after he is defeated in battle. Before his fight with White Monkey, Pipotchi is kidnapped, in order to transfer the data in his Monkey Helmet (a re-engineered model, which is the reason he is friendly towards humans) into a device called the Lethargy Laser. Rescuing Pipotchi, Hikaru makes his way through a monkey controlled military base, and confronts Specter, who is waiting for him with a redesigned version of his battle cruiser from the first game. Before the two can battle, Yellow Monkey, now a giant monster thanks to an overdose of Vita-Z bananas attacks the facility. Specter flees, and Hikaru manages to downsize and capture Yellow.

Hikaru, the Professor and Natsumi then discover the purpose of the Lethargy Laser. By firing it at the globe, all humans worldwide will lose the will to fight back, making it easier for Specter and the monkeys to take over the world. Hikaru confronts Specter at his Moon base, who attacks him with a giant robot. Once defeated, Specter attempts to fire the laser, but Hikaru states that humans will never give up, and captures him. Hikaru and Pipotchi then flee the exploding Moon base.

Shortly afterwards, Specter escapes and goes into hiding. Hikaru then proceeds to capture all the remaining monkeys before the Professor discovers Specter's hiding place. Hikaru warps there, encountering Specter, and the two of them battle again. Specter loses and is once again captured. The game ends with Kakeru visiting the laboratory, which is again destroyed when Hikaru accidentally crashes a spaceship into it.

== Development ==
The game was directed and produced by Naoto Ohta, formerly of Capcom. The music of the game was composed by Koji Hayama, managed by Don Makkou and Bungo Fujiwara of Two Five and data programmed by Masaaki Kaneko of Procyon Studio. The game's sound effects were created by Takashi Kanai and Junko Sano. The voice acting of the American version was recorded by Dan Rich and Jeremy Blaustein. The American voice cast features Rachael Lillis as Natalie, Jay Snyder as the Professor and Spike, Gary Littman as White Monkey, Carter Cathcart as Yellow Monkey, Greg Abbey as Specter, Blue Monkey, and Red Monkey, Tara Sands as Pipotchi, and Kathleen McInerney as Jimmy. The voice acting of the European version was recorded at Side UK on Great Titchfield Street in London, with Andy Emery serving as the voice director. The European voice cast consists of Jonathan Keeble as the Professor and Red Monkey, Marc Silk as Specter and White Monkey, David Holt as Hikaru, Yellow Monkey and Pipotchi, Rachel Preece as Natsumi and Pink Monkey (the latter of the two was reused for the American version) and Richard Pearce as Blue Monkey and Kakeru. The PAL version of Ape Escape 2 was re-released as a PSN title in 2016, featuring trophies and upscaled graphics. There's also remote play and second screen options available.

== Reception ==
Reception

Aggregate score
Aggregator	Score
Metacritic	82/100

Review scores
Publication	Score
AllGame	3.5/5
Edge	7/10
Electronic Gaming Monthly	7.33/10 (Note: Three critics of Electronic Gaming Monthly gave the game each a score of 8.5/10, 6/10, and 7.5/10.)
Eurogamer	6/10
Famitsu	9/10, 8/10, 8/10, 7/10
Game Informer	7.5/10
GameSpot	(US) 8.4/10 (JP) 8/10
GameSpy	4/5
IGN	9/10
Official U.S. PlayStation Magazine	4.5/5
The Village Voice	9/10

The game received "favorable" reviews according to the review aggregation website Metacritic. GamePro said of the game, "What makes Ape Escape 2 rule is that it simply feels like no other game, thanks to an intuitive analog control scheme in which pressing or rotating the right stick both aims and activates your various gadgets." (Note: GamePro gave the game two 4/5 scores for graphics and sound, and two 4.5/5 scores for control and fun factor.)

Kotaku praised the game citing the PlayStation 4 port which was released on PSN in August 2016. IGN said: "More than anything, the inescapable level of addiction in COLLECTING monkeys is the overriding reason to not just rent, but to buy and cherish this game." GameSpot said: "The game's relative ease is offset by the sheer number of weird unlockable items, and the end result is a platform game that is, above all, great fun."

== Notes ==
• The chinese version was released in January 15, 2004 as a launch title for the chinese PlayStation 2 console (SCPH-50009) in Mainland China. This version cannot be played on a non-chinese console, only works on the SCPH-50009 console.
