= Ape Escape 3 =

2005 video game

- North American cover art
- Developer: Sony Computer Entertainment Japan
- Publisher: Sony Computer Entertainment
- Directors: Naoto Ohta; Yuzo Sugano
- Producer: Naoto Ohta
- Composer: Soichi Terada
- Series: Ape Escape
- Platform: PlayStation 2
- Release: JP: July 14, 2005; NA: January 17, 2006; EU: May 5, 2006; AU: May 18, 2006
- Genres: Platform, action-adventure
- Mode: Single-player

Ape Escape 3 (Note: Known as Saru! Get You! 3 (サルゲッチュ3, Saru Getchu Surī) in Japan) is a 2005 platform game developed and published by Sony Computer Entertainment for the PlayStation 2. It is part of the Ape Escape series.

== Gameplay ==
Playing as either Satoru (Kei) or Sayaka (Yumi), gameplay follows that of the previous games in which the player must catch several monkeys by using various gadgets controlled with the right analogue stick. While there are fewer gadgets in this game than previous entries, a new feature in this game is the ability to morph into different forms through a device built by Aki. Some monkeys may also try to steal the player's Stun Club or Time Net and use it against them, and can even force them out of the level by catching them with their own net. Playing as Sayaka has an additional benefit; owing to her pop idol status, certain monkeys will go star-struck upon sight of Sayaka, allowing for an easy capture.

=== Metal Gear Solid ===
A minigame featured in the game is Mesal Gear Solid: Snake Escape (メサルギアソリッド, Mesaru Gia Soriddo), a spoof of Metal Gear Solid (the name is a pun on "metal" (メタル, metaru) and "monkey" (猿, saru)). In this game, players control Pipo Snake, a monkey loaded with Solid Snake's battle data, sent on a mission to rescue Snake and destroy a monkey-like Metal Gear. Gameplay is similar to Metal Gear Solid in which players have to use stealth and weapons to sneak around undetected and rescue prisoners. Players are equipped with a Banana Pistol for stunning enemies and Pineapple Grenades for breaking open flimsy walls. Similarly, the original PlayStation 2 editions of Metal Gear Solid 3: Snake Eater include a Snake vs. Monkey mode in which Snake has to capture monkeys.

== Plot ==
Specter, the Pipo Monkeys' leader, finds a Monkey Helmet, and hires the human scientist Dr. Tomoki (Dr. トモウキ, Dokutā Tomōki) to aid him in his evil plans. They establish television stations protected by the Freaky Monkey Five where they plan to broadcast TV shows worldwide. The television shows that are broadcast on every television put every human except the twins Satoru and Sayaka (Note: The version of the game released in the United Kingdom uses the original Japanese names, while the version released in the United States and Canada changes the names.) (Kei and Yumi in the North American English version), their aunt Aki, and Natsumi (Natalie) into a mindless trance. When Natsumi informs Satoru and Sayaka that Kakeru (Spike), Hikaru (Jimmy) and the Professor were all infected by the television show, Satoru and Sayaka go out to catch the monkeys and thwart Specter and Tomoki.

Their mission was to go to every movie set and capture all the monkeys there and destroy the satellite there. Satoru and Sayaka easily capture Monkey White, Monkey Blue, and Monkey Yellow. When they reach the TV Station where Monkey Pink is, Satoru and Sayaka's attempts to capture her fail and she escapes, although they manage to stop her Specter TV broadcast anyway. They manage to capture Monkey Red afterwards.

When they reach Tomoki City, Tomoki challenges them to a battle in his giant Tomo-King robot. Upon being defeated by Satoru and Sayaka, Tomoki's afro is revealed to be a wig covering a Pipo Helmet grafted to his head, which he reveals was the result of a lab accident where he was a test subject for the original Peak Point Helmet. Specter arrives via video broadcast and mocks Tomoki, who, in response, takes the side of Satoru and Sayaka, granting them permission to take his rocket to space to defeat his former partner. Once they reach Specter's outer space base of operations, Space Station SARU-3, they capture all the monkeys and deactivate the movie sets on their way to Specter. When they reach Specter, he tells them his plan about how he will use his space station to cut the Earth in half and keep half of it for the monkeys (leaving the other half, originally meant for Tomoki, to the humans). Afterwards he gets in his new Gorilliac Mech and tries to activate his plan. He is defeated and the two escape from the satellite, leaving Tomoki to deactivate the Twin Heavens via the self-destruct button, seemingly losing his life in the process. However, during the game's credits, it is revealed that he has survived the explosion.

After Specter is defeated, Monkey Pink releases him and the rest of the Freaky Monkey Five. After Satoru and Sayaka re-battle and re-capture the Freaky Monkey Five, Aki pinpoints the location where Specter is hiding out, and so Satoru and Sayaka travel there to face Specter once more and capture him again.

To complete the game 100 %, all the 442 monkeys have to be caught, all the time trials have to be completed with a gold time, and all the items, CDs, Video Tapes (except 28), Car Skins, Genie Dance tracks, books, etc. have to be bought. The game holds a total of 434 monkeys if the secret code monkeys are not caught.

== Reception ==
Reception

Aggregate score
Aggregator	Score
Metacritic	77/100

Review scores
Publication	Score
1Up.com	C
Computer Games Magazine	4.5/5
Edge	7/10
Electronic Gaming Monthly	6.17/10 (Note: Three critics of Electronic Gaming Monthly gave the game each a score of 8/10, 5/10, and 5.5/10.)
Eurogamer	6/10
Famitsu	36/40
Game Informer	8.75/10
GameDaily	3.5/5
GameRevolution	B
GameSpot	8.2/10
GameSpy	4/5
GameZone	8/10
Hardcore Gamer	4.75/5
IGN	8.3/10
Official U.S. PlayStation Magazine	3/5
The Sydney Morning Herald	3.5/5

Ape Escape 3 received "generally favourable reviews" according to the review aggregation website Metacritic. In Japan, Famitsu gave it a score of 36 out of 40. GamePro said, "Ape Escape 3 runs smoothly and is worth your hard earned dollar. It's a fun, perfect time killer—especially for the obsessive gamer who likes to complete 100 percent of the game." (Note: GamePro gave the game three 4/5 scores for graphics, control, and fun factor, and 3/5 for sound.)
